

321001–321100 

|-bgcolor=#d6d6d6
| 321001 ||  || — || May 27, 2008 || Kitt Peak || Spacewatch || — || align=right | 3.0 km || 
|-id=002 bgcolor=#E9E9E9
| 321002 ||  || — || May 27, 2008 || Kitt Peak || Spacewatch || — || align=right | 2.2 km || 
|-id=003 bgcolor=#d6d6d6
| 321003 ||  || — || May 27, 2008 || Kitt Peak || Spacewatch || — || align=right | 3.1 km || 
|-id=004 bgcolor=#d6d6d6
| 321004 ||  || — || May 28, 2008 || Kitt Peak || Spacewatch || HYG || align=right | 3.3 km || 
|-id=005 bgcolor=#d6d6d6
| 321005 ||  || — || May 28, 2008 || Kitt Peak || Spacewatch || TIR || align=right | 3.7 km || 
|-id=006 bgcolor=#d6d6d6
| 321006 ||  || — || May 29, 2008 || Kitt Peak || Spacewatch || EOS || align=right | 2.0 km || 
|-id=007 bgcolor=#E9E9E9
| 321007 ||  || — || May 29, 2008 || Kitt Peak || Spacewatch || — || align=right | 1.9 km || 
|-id=008 bgcolor=#d6d6d6
| 321008 ||  || — || May 30, 2008 || Kitt Peak || Spacewatch || — || align=right | 2.2 km || 
|-id=009 bgcolor=#d6d6d6
| 321009 ||  || — || May 29, 2008 || Kitt Peak || Spacewatch || — || align=right | 4.2 km || 
|-id=010 bgcolor=#d6d6d6
| 321010 ||  || — || May 29, 2008 || Mount Lemmon || Mount Lemmon Survey || EOS || align=right | 2.0 km || 
|-id=011 bgcolor=#E9E9E9
| 321011 ||  || — || May 29, 2008 || Kitt Peak || Spacewatch || — || align=right | 2.3 km || 
|-id=012 bgcolor=#E9E9E9
| 321012 ||  || — || May 31, 2008 || Kitt Peak || Spacewatch || — || align=right | 2.0 km || 
|-id=013 bgcolor=#E9E9E9
| 321013 ||  || — || May 30, 2008 || Kitt Peak || Spacewatch || — || align=right | 1.8 km || 
|-id=014 bgcolor=#E9E9E9
| 321014 ||  || — || June 1, 2008 || Mount Lemmon || Mount Lemmon Survey || — || align=right | 1.5 km || 
|-id=015 bgcolor=#d6d6d6
| 321015 ||  || — || June 1, 2008 || Kitt Peak || Spacewatch || EOS || align=right | 2.2 km || 
|-id=016 bgcolor=#E9E9E9
| 321016 ||  || — || June 2, 2008 || Kitt Peak || Spacewatch || — || align=right | 3.3 km || 
|-id=017 bgcolor=#d6d6d6
| 321017 ||  || — || June 7, 2008 || Kitt Peak || Spacewatch || — || align=right | 3.0 km || 
|-id=018 bgcolor=#E9E9E9
| 321018 ||  || — || June 5, 2008 || Mount Lemmon || Mount Lemmon Survey || GEF || align=right | 1.2 km || 
|-id=019 bgcolor=#d6d6d6
| 321019 ||  || — || June 8, 2008 || Kitt Peak || Spacewatch || — || align=right | 3.5 km || 
|-id=020 bgcolor=#E9E9E9
| 321020 ||  || — || June 10, 2008 || Kitt Peak || Spacewatch || — || align=right | 2.7 km || 
|-id=021 bgcolor=#E9E9E9
| 321021 ||  || — || June 10, 2008 || Kitt Peak || Spacewatch || — || align=right | 1.4 km || 
|-id=022 bgcolor=#E9E9E9
| 321022 ||  || — || June 15, 2008 || Siding Spring || SSS || — || align=right | 2.5 km || 
|-id=023 bgcolor=#d6d6d6
| 321023 || 2008 MA || — || June 22, 2008 || Kitt Peak || Spacewatch || — || align=right | 3.8 km || 
|-id=024 bgcolor=#E9E9E9
| 321024 Gijon ||  ||  || June 28, 2008 || La Cañada || J. Lacruz || — || align=right | 3.4 km || 
|-id=025 bgcolor=#FA8072
| 321025 ||  || — || June 28, 2008 || Siding Spring || SSS || — || align=right | 2.9 km || 
|-id=026 bgcolor=#E9E9E9
| 321026 ||  || — || June 24, 2008 || Kitt Peak || Spacewatch || GEF || align=right | 1.4 km || 
|-id=027 bgcolor=#d6d6d6
| 321027 ||  || — || July 6, 2008 || Pla D'Arguines || R. Ferrando || URS || align=right | 5.8 km || 
|-id=028 bgcolor=#d6d6d6
| 321028 ||  || — || July 28, 2008 || Dauban || F. Kugel || — || align=right | 4.4 km || 
|-id=029 bgcolor=#E9E9E9
| 321029 ||  || — || July 29, 2008 || Mount Lemmon || Mount Lemmon Survey || — || align=right | 1.4 km || 
|-id=030 bgcolor=#d6d6d6
| 321030 ||  || — || July 30, 2008 || Kitt Peak || Spacewatch || HYG || align=right | 3.8 km || 
|-id=031 bgcolor=#E9E9E9
| 321031 ||  || — || July 30, 2008 || Mount Lemmon || Mount Lemmon Survey || — || align=right | 1.6 km || 
|-id=032 bgcolor=#d6d6d6
| 321032 ||  || — || August 5, 2008 || Hibiscus || S. F. Hönig, N. Teamo || EOS || align=right | 2.5 km || 
|-id=033 bgcolor=#d6d6d6
| 321033 ||  || — || August 5, 2008 || La Sagra || OAM Obs. || LAU || align=right | 1.5 km || 
|-id=034 bgcolor=#d6d6d6
| 321034 ||  || — || August 6, 2008 || La Sagra || OAM Obs. || — || align=right | 3.3 km || 
|-id=035 bgcolor=#d6d6d6
| 321035 ||  || — || August 7, 2008 || Reedy Creek || J. Broughton || — || align=right | 4.0 km || 
|-id=036 bgcolor=#E9E9E9
| 321036 ||  || — || August 12, 2008 || Socorro || LINEAR || — || align=right | 2.5 km || 
|-id=037 bgcolor=#d6d6d6
| 321037 ||  || — || August 25, 2008 || Sandlot || G. Hug || VER || align=right | 3.0 km || 
|-id=038 bgcolor=#d6d6d6
| 321038 ||  || — || August 22, 2008 || Kitt Peak || Spacewatch || EMA || align=right | 3.1 km || 
|-id=039 bgcolor=#d6d6d6
| 321039 ||  || — || August 26, 2008 || Dauban || F. Kugel || — || align=right | 3.1 km || 
|-id=040 bgcolor=#d6d6d6
| 321040 ||  || — || August 26, 2008 || Socorro || LINEAR || — || align=right | 6.5 km || 
|-id=041 bgcolor=#E9E9E9
| 321041 ||  || — || December 7, 2001 || Kitt Peak || Spacewatch || — || align=right | 1.1 km || 
|-id=042 bgcolor=#E9E9E9
| 321042 ||  || — || August 30, 2008 || La Sagra || OAM Obs. || — || align=right | 3.4 km || 
|-id=043 bgcolor=#d6d6d6
| 321043 ||  || — || August 30, 2008 || La Sagra || OAM Obs. || — || align=right | 6.0 km || 
|-id=044 bgcolor=#fefefe
| 321044 ||  || — || August 30, 2008 || Socorro || LINEAR || — || align=right | 1.3 km || 
|-id=045 bgcolor=#fefefe
| 321045 Kretinga ||  ||  || August 31, 2008 || Moletai || Molėtai Obs. || — || align=right data-sort-value="0.94" | 940 m || 
|-id=046 bgcolor=#d6d6d6
| 321046 Klushantsev ||  ||  || August 29, 2008 || Zelenchukskaya || T. V. Kryachko || — || align=right | 3.5 km || 
|-id=047 bgcolor=#d6d6d6
| 321047 ||  || — || August 26, 2008 || La Sagra || OAM Obs. || — || align=right | 2.7 km || 
|-id=048 bgcolor=#d6d6d6
| 321048 ||  || — || September 4, 2008 || Kitt Peak || Spacewatch || — || align=right | 3.3 km || 
|-id=049 bgcolor=#fefefe
| 321049 ||  || — || September 4, 2008 || Socorro || LINEAR || H || align=right data-sort-value="0.63" | 630 m || 
|-id=050 bgcolor=#d6d6d6
| 321050 ||  || — || September 1, 2008 || La Sagra || OAM Obs. || — || align=right | 3.9 km || 
|-id=051 bgcolor=#d6d6d6
| 321051 ||  || — || September 4, 2008 || Kitt Peak || Spacewatch || — || align=right | 3.2 km || 
|-id=052 bgcolor=#E9E9E9
| 321052 ||  || — || September 4, 2008 || Kitt Peak || Spacewatch || — || align=right | 1.1 km || 
|-id=053 bgcolor=#fefefe
| 321053 ||  || — || October 28, 2005 || Mount Lemmon || Mount Lemmon Survey || NYS || align=right data-sort-value="0.68" | 680 m || 
|-id=054 bgcolor=#d6d6d6
| 321054 ||  || — || September 7, 2008 || Mount Lemmon || Mount Lemmon Survey || K-2 || align=right | 1.6 km || 
|-id=055 bgcolor=#d6d6d6
| 321055 ||  || — || September 4, 2008 || Kitt Peak || Spacewatch || — || align=right | 3.0 km || 
|-id=056 bgcolor=#E9E9E9
| 321056 ||  || — || September 7, 2008 || Mount Lemmon || Mount Lemmon Survey || — || align=right | 1.9 km || 
|-id=057 bgcolor=#fefefe
| 321057 ||  || — || September 2, 2008 || Kitt Peak || Spacewatch || — || align=right | 1.2 km || 
|-id=058 bgcolor=#fefefe
| 321058 ||  || — || September 6, 2008 || Catalina || CSS || — || align=right data-sort-value="0.74" | 740 m || 
|-id=059 bgcolor=#E9E9E9
| 321059 ||  || — || September 6, 2008 || Catalina || CSS || RAF || align=right | 1.2 km || 
|-id=060 bgcolor=#E9E9E9
| 321060 ||  || — || September 6, 2008 || Mount Lemmon || Mount Lemmon Survey || AGN || align=right | 1.4 km || 
|-id=061 bgcolor=#fefefe
| 321061 ||  || — || September 7, 2008 || Catalina || CSS || MAS || align=right | 1.1 km || 
|-id=062 bgcolor=#d6d6d6
| 321062 ||  || — || September 19, 2008 || Kitt Peak || Spacewatch || — || align=right | 3.8 km || 
|-id=063 bgcolor=#d6d6d6
| 321063 ||  || — || September 12, 1998 || Kitt Peak || Spacewatch || 628 || align=right | 1.8 km || 
|-id=064 bgcolor=#d6d6d6
| 321064 ||  || — || September 20, 2008 || Catalina || CSS || — || align=right | 3.2 km || 
|-id=065 bgcolor=#d6d6d6
| 321065 ||  || — || August 24, 2008 || Kitt Peak || Spacewatch || URS || align=right | 2.9 km || 
|-id=066 bgcolor=#E9E9E9
| 321066 ||  || — || September 20, 2008 || Kitt Peak || Spacewatch || — || align=right | 3.6 km || 
|-id=067 bgcolor=#C2FFFF
| 321067 ||  || — || September 20, 2008 || Mount Lemmon || Mount Lemmon Survey || L4 || align=right | 10 km || 
|-id=068 bgcolor=#d6d6d6
| 321068 ||  || — || September 20, 2008 || Kitt Peak || Spacewatch || CHA || align=right | 2.8 km || 
|-id=069 bgcolor=#fefefe
| 321069 ||  || — || September 20, 2008 || Kitt Peak || Spacewatch || — || align=right data-sort-value="0.91" | 910 m || 
|-id=070 bgcolor=#C2FFFF
| 321070 ||  || — || September 20, 2008 || Kitt Peak || Spacewatch || L4 || align=right | 9.0 km || 
|-id=071 bgcolor=#fefefe
| 321071 ||  || — || September 21, 2008 || Kitt Peak || Spacewatch || — || align=right data-sort-value="0.62" | 620 m || 
|-id=072 bgcolor=#fefefe
| 321072 ||  || — || September 21, 2008 || Kitt Peak || Spacewatch || H || align=right data-sort-value="0.62" | 620 m || 
|-id=073 bgcolor=#fefefe
| 321073 ||  || — || September 21, 2008 || Mount Lemmon || Mount Lemmon Survey || — || align=right data-sort-value="0.94" | 940 m || 
|-id=074 bgcolor=#C2FFFF
| 321074 ||  || — || September 21, 2008 || Kitt Peak || Spacewatch || L4 || align=right | 13 km || 
|-id=075 bgcolor=#fefefe
| 321075 ||  || — || September 22, 2008 || Kitt Peak || Spacewatch || — || align=right data-sort-value="0.86" | 860 m || 
|-id=076 bgcolor=#d6d6d6
| 321076 ||  || — || September 23, 2008 || Mount Lemmon || Mount Lemmon Survey || THM || align=right | 2.3 km || 
|-id=077 bgcolor=#E9E9E9
| 321077 ||  || — || September 27, 2008 || Sierra Stars || F. Tozzi || — || align=right | 2.5 km || 
|-id=078 bgcolor=#C2FFFF
| 321078 ||  || — || September 21, 2008 || Kitt Peak || Spacewatch || L4 || align=right | 11 km || 
|-id=079 bgcolor=#E9E9E9
| 321079 ||  || — || September 21, 2008 || Kitt Peak || Spacewatch || — || align=right | 3.5 km || 
|-id=080 bgcolor=#d6d6d6
| 321080 ||  || — || September 21, 2008 || Kitt Peak || Spacewatch || — || align=right | 3.5 km || 
|-id=081 bgcolor=#E9E9E9
| 321081 ||  || — || September 21, 2008 || Kitt Peak || Spacewatch || MRX || align=right | 1.5 km || 
|-id=082 bgcolor=#C2FFFF
| 321082 ||  || — || September 22, 2008 || Mount Lemmon || Mount Lemmon Survey || L4 || align=right | 8.8 km || 
|-id=083 bgcolor=#d6d6d6
| 321083 ||  || — || September 22, 2008 || Kitt Peak || Spacewatch || KOR || align=right | 1.6 km || 
|-id=084 bgcolor=#E9E9E9
| 321084 ||  || — || September 24, 2008 || Goodricke-Pigott || R. A. Tucker || — || align=right | 3.6 km || 
|-id=085 bgcolor=#fefefe
| 321085 ||  || — || September 29, 2008 || Dauban || F. Kugel || V || align=right data-sort-value="0.95" | 950 m || 
|-id=086 bgcolor=#C2FFFF
| 321086 ||  || — || September 28, 2008 || Socorro || LINEAR || L4 || align=right | 9.6 km || 
|-id=087 bgcolor=#E9E9E9
| 321087 ||  || — || September 22, 2008 || Catalina || CSS || — || align=right | 4.1 km || 
|-id=088 bgcolor=#fefefe
| 321088 ||  || — || September 25, 2008 || Kitt Peak || Spacewatch || — || align=right | 1.0 km || 
|-id=089 bgcolor=#d6d6d6
| 321089 ||  || — || September 25, 2008 || Kitt Peak || Spacewatch || KOR || align=right | 1.6 km || 
|-id=090 bgcolor=#d6d6d6
| 321090 ||  || — || September 27, 2008 || Mount Lemmon || Mount Lemmon Survey || THM || align=right | 3.0 km || 
|-id=091 bgcolor=#C2FFFF
| 321091 ||  || — || September 26, 2008 || Kitt Peak || Spacewatch || L4 || align=right | 8.3 km || 
|-id=092 bgcolor=#d6d6d6
| 321092 ||  || — || September 20, 2008 || Kitt Peak || Spacewatch || — || align=right | 3.6 km || 
|-id=093 bgcolor=#d6d6d6
| 321093 ||  || — || September 23, 2008 || Kitt Peak || Spacewatch || THM || align=right | 2.7 km || 
|-id=094 bgcolor=#E9E9E9
| 321094 ||  || — || September 25, 2008 || Kitt Peak || Spacewatch || WIT || align=right | 1.0 km || 
|-id=095 bgcolor=#C2FFFF
| 321095 ||  || — || September 3, 2008 || Kitt Peak || Spacewatch || L4ERY || align=right | 8.1 km || 
|-id=096 bgcolor=#fefefe
| 321096 ||  || — || September 24, 2008 || Kitt Peak || Spacewatch || — || align=right data-sort-value="0.78" | 780 m || 
|-id=097 bgcolor=#E9E9E9
| 321097 ||  || — || September 24, 2008 || Kitt Peak || Spacewatch || NEM || align=right | 2.6 km || 
|-id=098 bgcolor=#E9E9E9
| 321098 ||  || — || September 24, 2008 || Catalina || CSS || MAR || align=right | 1.9 km || 
|-id=099 bgcolor=#d6d6d6
| 321099 ||  || — || September 27, 2008 || Mount Lemmon || Mount Lemmon Survey || HYG || align=right | 3.6 km || 
|-id=100 bgcolor=#E9E9E9
| 321100 ||  || — || October 1, 2008 || Catalina || Spacewatch || — || align=right | 3.3 km || 
|}

321101–321200 

|-bgcolor=#E9E9E9
| 321101 ||  || — || October 2, 2008 || Kitt Peak || Spacewatch || — || align=right | 2.3 km || 
|-id=102 bgcolor=#d6d6d6
| 321102 ||  || — || October 2, 2008 || Kitt Peak || Spacewatch || — || align=right | 2.9 km || 
|-id=103 bgcolor=#C2FFFF
| 321103 ||  || — || October 2, 2008 || Kitt Peak || Spacewatch || L4 || align=right | 6.4 km || 
|-id=104 bgcolor=#d6d6d6
| 321104 ||  || — || October 2, 2008 || Kitt Peak || Spacewatch || — || align=right | 2.4 km || 
|-id=105 bgcolor=#fefefe
| 321105 ||  || — || October 2, 2008 || Kitt Peak || Spacewatch || — || align=right data-sort-value="0.86" | 860 m || 
|-id=106 bgcolor=#E9E9E9
| 321106 ||  || — || October 2, 2008 || Kitt Peak || Spacewatch || HEN || align=right | 1.2 km || 
|-id=107 bgcolor=#d6d6d6
| 321107 ||  || — || November 26, 2003 || Kitt Peak || Spacewatch || HYG || align=right | 2.5 km || 
|-id=108 bgcolor=#E9E9E9
| 321108 ||  || — || October 2, 2008 || Kitt Peak || Spacewatch || — || align=right | 1.4 km || 
|-id=109 bgcolor=#E9E9E9
| 321109 ||  || — || October 3, 2008 || Kitt Peak || Spacewatch || — || align=right | 1.8 km || 
|-id=110 bgcolor=#fefefe
| 321110 ||  || — || October 5, 2008 || La Sagra || OAM Obs. || fast? || align=right data-sort-value="0.92" | 920 m || 
|-id=111 bgcolor=#E9E9E9
| 321111 ||  || — || October 6, 2008 || Mount Lemmon || Mount Lemmon Survey || — || align=right | 2.1 km || 
|-id=112 bgcolor=#C2FFFF
| 321112 ||  || — || October 8, 2008 || Mount Lemmon || Mount Lemmon Survey || L4 || align=right | 13 km || 
|-id=113 bgcolor=#C2FFFF
| 321113 ||  || — || October 8, 2008 || Mount Lemmon || Mount Lemmon Survey || L4ERY || align=right | 11 km || 
|-id=114 bgcolor=#E9E9E9
| 321114 ||  || — || October 8, 2008 || Mount Lemmon || Mount Lemmon Survey || — || align=right | 1.7 km || 
|-id=115 bgcolor=#C2FFFF
| 321115 ||  || — || October 9, 2008 || Mount Lemmon || Mount Lemmon Survey || L4ERY || align=right | 11 km || 
|-id=116 bgcolor=#FA8072
| 321116 ||  || — || October 4, 2008 || Catalina || CSS || H || align=right data-sort-value="0.53" | 530 m || 
|-id=117 bgcolor=#d6d6d6
| 321117 ||  || — || October 2, 2008 || Kitt Peak || Spacewatch || — || align=right | 3.3 km || 
|-id=118 bgcolor=#E9E9E9
| 321118 ||  || — || October 1, 2008 || Mount Lemmon || Mount Lemmon Survey || — || align=right | 2.1 km || 
|-id=119 bgcolor=#E9E9E9
| 321119 ||  || — || October 9, 2008 || Catalina || CSS || EUN || align=right | 1.6 km || 
|-id=120 bgcolor=#C2FFFF
| 321120 ||  || — || April 1, 2003 || Kitt Peak || M. W. Buie || L4 || align=right | 8.7 km || 
|-id=121 bgcolor=#E9E9E9
| 321121 ||  || — || October 17, 2008 || Kitt Peak || Spacewatch || — || align=right | 1.6 km || 
|-id=122 bgcolor=#d6d6d6
| 321122 ||  || — || October 17, 2008 || Kitt Peak || Spacewatch || — || align=right | 4.1 km || 
|-id=123 bgcolor=#d6d6d6
| 321123 ||  || — || October 20, 2008 || Mount Lemmon || Mount Lemmon Survey || — || align=right | 2.8 km || 
|-id=124 bgcolor=#d6d6d6
| 321124 ||  || — || October 20, 2008 || Mount Lemmon || Mount Lemmon Survey || KOR || align=right | 1.4 km || 
|-id=125 bgcolor=#d6d6d6
| 321125 ||  || — || October 21, 2008 || Kitt Peak || Spacewatch || KOR || align=right | 1.6 km || 
|-id=126 bgcolor=#E9E9E9
| 321126 ||  || — || October 21, 2008 || Kitt Peak || Spacewatch || — || align=right | 1.6 km || 
|-id=127 bgcolor=#E9E9E9
| 321127 ||  || — || October 21, 2008 || Lulin Observatory || LUSS || — || align=right | 2.5 km || 
|-id=128 bgcolor=#d6d6d6
| 321128 ||  || — || October 22, 2008 || Kitt Peak || Spacewatch || — || align=right | 3.0 km || 
|-id=129 bgcolor=#E9E9E9
| 321129 ||  || — || October 22, 2008 || Kitt Peak || Spacewatch || — || align=right | 1.3 km || 
|-id=130 bgcolor=#fefefe
| 321130 ||  || — || October 23, 2008 || Mount Lemmon || Mount Lemmon Survey || — || align=right data-sort-value="0.86" | 860 m || 
|-id=131 bgcolor=#E9E9E9
| 321131 Alishan ||  ||  || October 23, 2008 || Lulin || X. Y. Hsiao, Q.-z. Ye || — || align=right | 1.7 km || 
|-id=132 bgcolor=#fefefe
| 321132 ||  || — || October 22, 2008 || Kitt Peak || Spacewatch || H || align=right data-sort-value="0.87" | 870 m || 
|-id=133 bgcolor=#E9E9E9
| 321133 ||  || — || October 23, 2008 || Kitt Peak || Spacewatch || HEN || align=right | 1.2 km || 
|-id=134 bgcolor=#E9E9E9
| 321134 ||  || — || October 23, 2008 || Kitt Peak || Spacewatch || — || align=right | 1.5 km || 
|-id=135 bgcolor=#E9E9E9
| 321135 ||  || — || October 23, 2008 || Kitt Peak || Spacewatch || — || align=right | 1.2 km || 
|-id=136 bgcolor=#d6d6d6
| 321136 ||  || — || November 19, 2003 || Kitt Peak || Spacewatch || KOR || align=right | 1.7 km || 
|-id=137 bgcolor=#d6d6d6
| 321137 ||  || — || October 23, 2008 || Kitt Peak || Spacewatch || KOR || align=right | 1.5 km || 
|-id=138 bgcolor=#C2FFFF
| 321138 ||  || — || October 23, 2008 || Mount Lemmon || Mount Lemmon Survey || L4 || align=right | 10 km || 
|-id=139 bgcolor=#E9E9E9
| 321139 ||  || — || October 23, 2008 || Mount Lemmon || Mount Lemmon Survey || HEN || align=right | 1.2 km || 
|-id=140 bgcolor=#E9E9E9
| 321140 ||  || — || October 24, 2008 || Kitt Peak || Spacewatch || — || align=right | 1.9 km || 
|-id=141 bgcolor=#E9E9E9
| 321141 ||  || — || October 24, 2008 || Mount Lemmon || Mount Lemmon Survey || — || align=right | 2.3 km || 
|-id=142 bgcolor=#E9E9E9
| 321142 ||  || — || October 24, 2008 || Kitt Peak || Spacewatch || — || align=right | 1.8 km || 
|-id=143 bgcolor=#d6d6d6
| 321143 ||  || — || October 27, 2008 || Mount Lemmon || Mount Lemmon Survey || — || align=right | 2.6 km || 
|-id=144 bgcolor=#E9E9E9
| 321144 ||  || — || October 25, 2008 || Kitt Peak || Spacewatch || — || align=right | 1.8 km || 
|-id=145 bgcolor=#E9E9E9
| 321145 ||  || — || October 25, 2008 || Catalina || CSS || — || align=right | 1.4 km || 
|-id=146 bgcolor=#d6d6d6
| 321146 ||  || — || October 27, 2008 || Kitt Peak || Spacewatch || KOR || align=right | 1.5 km || 
|-id=147 bgcolor=#d6d6d6
| 321147 ||  || — || October 27, 2008 || Kitt Peak || Spacewatch || KOR || align=right | 1.6 km || 
|-id=148 bgcolor=#d6d6d6
| 321148 ||  || — || October 28, 2008 || Mount Lemmon || Mount Lemmon Survey || 7:4 || align=right | 4.1 km || 
|-id=149 bgcolor=#d6d6d6
| 321149 ||  || — || October 29, 2008 || Kitt Peak || Spacewatch || — || align=right | 3.0 km || 
|-id=150 bgcolor=#C2FFFF
| 321150 ||  || — || September 29, 2008 || Mount Lemmon || Mount Lemmon Survey || L4 || align=right | 7.9 km || 
|-id=151 bgcolor=#fefefe
| 321151 ||  || — || October 29, 2008 || Kitt Peak || Spacewatch || NYS || align=right data-sort-value="0.74" | 740 m || 
|-id=152 bgcolor=#E9E9E9
| 321152 ||  || — || October 30, 2008 || Catalina || CSS || — || align=right | 3.3 km || 
|-id=153 bgcolor=#E9E9E9
| 321153 ||  || — || October 30, 2008 || Kitt Peak || Spacewatch || — || align=right | 1.6 km || 
|-id=154 bgcolor=#fefefe
| 321154 ||  || — || October 30, 2008 || Mount Lemmon || Mount Lemmon Survey || — || align=right data-sort-value="0.94" | 940 m || 
|-id=155 bgcolor=#d6d6d6
| 321155 ||  || — || October 31, 2008 || Kitt Peak || Spacewatch || — || align=right | 2.4 km || 
|-id=156 bgcolor=#fefefe
| 321156 ||  || — || October 31, 2008 || Mount Lemmon || Mount Lemmon Survey || — || align=right | 1.1 km || 
|-id=157 bgcolor=#E9E9E9
| 321157 ||  || — || October 25, 2008 || Kitt Peak || Spacewatch || — || align=right | 2.4 km || 
|-id=158 bgcolor=#E9E9E9
| 321158 ||  || — || October 31, 2008 || Kitt Peak || Spacewatch || — || align=right | 2.3 km || 
|-id=159 bgcolor=#E9E9E9
| 321159 ||  || — || October 25, 2008 || Catalina || CSS || — || align=right | 2.1 km || 
|-id=160 bgcolor=#fefefe
| 321160 ||  || — || October 31, 2008 || Kitt Peak || Spacewatch || — || align=right data-sort-value="0.71" | 710 m || 
|-id=161 bgcolor=#E9E9E9
| 321161 ||  || — || October 20, 2008 || Kitt Peak || Spacewatch || — || align=right | 2.5 km || 
|-id=162 bgcolor=#fefefe
| 321162 ||  || — || October 23, 2008 || Mount Lemmon || Mount Lemmon Survey || NYS || align=right data-sort-value="0.84" | 840 m || 
|-id=163 bgcolor=#E9E9E9
| 321163 ||  || — || November 4, 2008 || Bisei SG Center || BATTeRS || — || align=right | 3.4 km || 
|-id=164 bgcolor=#d6d6d6
| 321164 ||  || — || November 1, 2008 || Mount Lemmon || Mount Lemmon Survey || KOR || align=right | 1.6 km || 
|-id=165 bgcolor=#E9E9E9
| 321165 ||  || — || November 1, 2008 || Mount Lemmon || Mount Lemmon Survey || AGN || align=right | 1.2 km || 
|-id=166 bgcolor=#E9E9E9
| 321166 ||  || — || November 2, 2008 || Kitt Peak || Spacewatch || — || align=right | 1.7 km || 
|-id=167 bgcolor=#d6d6d6
| 321167 ||  || — || November 2, 2008 || Mount Lemmon || Mount Lemmon Survey || — || align=right | 4.0 km || 
|-id=168 bgcolor=#d6d6d6
| 321168 ||  || — || November 3, 2008 || Catalina || CSS || — || align=right | 4.1 km || 
|-id=169 bgcolor=#E9E9E9
| 321169 ||  || — || November 3, 2008 || Kitt Peak || Spacewatch || AGN || align=right | 1.2 km || 
|-id=170 bgcolor=#E9E9E9
| 321170 ||  || — || November 8, 2008 || Mount Lemmon || Mount Lemmon Survey || — || align=right | 2.5 km || 
|-id=171 bgcolor=#E9E9E9
| 321171 ||  || — || November 7, 2008 || Mount Lemmon || Mount Lemmon Survey || — || align=right | 1.5 km || 
|-id=172 bgcolor=#d6d6d6
| 321172 ||  || — || November 7, 2008 || Mount Lemmon || Mount Lemmon Survey || KOR || align=right | 1.4 km || 
|-id=173 bgcolor=#E9E9E9
| 321173 ||  || — || November 6, 2008 || Catalina || CSS || — || align=right | 3.2 km || 
|-id=174 bgcolor=#fefefe
| 321174 ||  || — || November 17, 2008 || Kitt Peak || Spacewatch || — || align=right data-sort-value="0.90" | 900 m || 
|-id=175 bgcolor=#d6d6d6
| 321175 ||  || — || November 17, 2008 || Kitt Peak || Spacewatch || THM || align=right | 3.0 km || 
|-id=176 bgcolor=#d6d6d6
| 321176 ||  || — || November 17, 2008 || Kitt Peak || Spacewatch || KOR || align=right | 1.3 km || 
|-id=177 bgcolor=#E9E9E9
| 321177 ||  || — || November 19, 2008 || Mount Lemmon || Mount Lemmon Survey || HEN || align=right | 1.4 km || 
|-id=178 bgcolor=#d6d6d6
| 321178 ||  || — || November 17, 2008 || Kitt Peak || Spacewatch || — || align=right | 5.0 km || 
|-id=179 bgcolor=#d6d6d6
| 321179 ||  || — || November 17, 2008 || Kitt Peak || Spacewatch || KOR || align=right | 1.5 km || 
|-id=180 bgcolor=#E9E9E9
| 321180 ||  || — || October 18, 2003 || Kitt Peak || Spacewatch || — || align=right | 3.4 km || 
|-id=181 bgcolor=#fefefe
| 321181 ||  || — || November 18, 2008 || Kitt Peak || Spacewatch || — || align=right | 1.1 km || 
|-id=182 bgcolor=#E9E9E9
| 321182 ||  || — || November 18, 2008 || Kitt Peak || Spacewatch || — || align=right | 1.5 km || 
|-id=183 bgcolor=#fefefe
| 321183 ||  || — || November 30, 2008 || Kitt Peak || Spacewatch || MAS || align=right data-sort-value="0.77" | 770 m || 
|-id=184 bgcolor=#E9E9E9
| 321184 ||  || — || November 30, 2008 || Mount Lemmon || Mount Lemmon Survey || — || align=right | 2.6 km || 
|-id=185 bgcolor=#E9E9E9
| 321185 ||  || — || November 19, 2008 || Kitt Peak || Spacewatch || — || align=right | 2.7 km || 
|-id=186 bgcolor=#d6d6d6
| 321186 ||  || — || October 16, 2002 || Palomar || NEAT || — || align=right | 3.9 km || 
|-id=187 bgcolor=#d6d6d6
| 321187 ||  || — || November 22, 2008 || Socorro || LINEAR || — || align=right | 5.7 km || 
|-id=188 bgcolor=#E9E9E9
| 321188 ||  || — || November 30, 2008 || Socorro || LINEAR || — || align=right | 1.5 km || 
|-id=189 bgcolor=#fefefe
| 321189 ||  || — || November 30, 2008 || Socorro || LINEAR || NYS || align=right data-sort-value="0.86" | 860 m || 
|-id=190 bgcolor=#E9E9E9
| 321190 ||  || — || December 1, 2008 || Kitt Peak || Spacewatch || — || align=right | 2.5 km || 
|-id=191 bgcolor=#E9E9E9
| 321191 ||  || — || December 1, 2008 || Kitt Peak || Spacewatch || — || align=right | 1.7 km || 
|-id=192 bgcolor=#E9E9E9
| 321192 ||  || — || December 4, 2008 || Mount Lemmon || Mount Lemmon Survey || GER || align=right | 2.0 km || 
|-id=193 bgcolor=#E9E9E9
| 321193 ||  || — || December 4, 2008 || Mount Lemmon || Mount Lemmon Survey || — || align=right | 2.3 km || 
|-id=194 bgcolor=#E9E9E9
| 321194 ||  || — || December 5, 2008 || Kitt Peak || Spacewatch || — || align=right | 1.4 km || 
|-id=195 bgcolor=#fefefe
| 321195 ||  || — || December 21, 2008 || Piszkéstető || K. Sárneczky || MAS || align=right data-sort-value="0.94" | 940 m || 
|-id=196 bgcolor=#fefefe
| 321196 ||  || — || December 23, 2008 || La Sagra || OAM Obs. || H || align=right | 1.0 km || 
|-id=197 bgcolor=#E9E9E9
| 321197 Qingdao ||  ||  || December 23, 2008 || Weihai || Shandong University Obs. || PAD || align=right | 2.9 km || 
|-id=198 bgcolor=#fefefe
| 321198 ||  || — || December 20, 2008 || Mount Lemmon || Mount Lemmon Survey || H || align=right | 1.1 km || 
|-id=199 bgcolor=#E9E9E9
| 321199 ||  || — || December 21, 2008 || Kitt Peak || Spacewatch || — || align=right | 1.5 km || 
|-id=200 bgcolor=#E9E9E9
| 321200 ||  || — || December 21, 2008 || Mount Lemmon || Mount Lemmon Survey || — || align=right | 1.3 km || 
|}

321201–321300 

|-bgcolor=#E9E9E9
| 321201 ||  || — || December 21, 2008 || Mount Lemmon || Mount Lemmon Survey || — || align=right | 1.4 km || 
|-id=202 bgcolor=#d6d6d6
| 321202 ||  || — || December 20, 2008 || La Sagra || OAM Obs. || — || align=right | 3.6 km || 
|-id=203 bgcolor=#E9E9E9
| 321203 ||  || — || December 28, 2008 || Mayhill || A. Lowe || — || align=right | 1.6 km || 
|-id=204 bgcolor=#E9E9E9
| 321204 ||  || — || December 22, 2008 || Kitt Peak || Spacewatch || — || align=right | 2.7 km || 
|-id=205 bgcolor=#fefefe
| 321205 ||  || — || December 22, 2008 || Kitt Peak || Spacewatch || MAS || align=right data-sort-value="0.93" | 930 m || 
|-id=206 bgcolor=#fefefe
| 321206 ||  || — || December 29, 2008 || Kitt Peak || Spacewatch || — || align=right data-sort-value="0.96" | 960 m || 
|-id=207 bgcolor=#d6d6d6
| 321207 ||  || — || December 30, 2008 || Mount Lemmon || Mount Lemmon Survey || EOS || align=right | 5.3 km || 
|-id=208 bgcolor=#fefefe
| 321208 ||  || — || December 30, 2008 || Kitt Peak || Spacewatch || NYS || align=right data-sort-value="0.87" | 870 m || 
|-id=209 bgcolor=#E9E9E9
| 321209 ||  || — || December 29, 2008 || Mount Lemmon || Mount Lemmon Survey || EUN || align=right | 1.7 km || 
|-id=210 bgcolor=#E9E9E9
| 321210 ||  || — || December 29, 2008 || Mount Lemmon || Mount Lemmon Survey || — || align=right | 1.7 km || 
|-id=211 bgcolor=#E9E9E9
| 321211 ||  || — || December 30, 2008 || Kitt Peak || Spacewatch || — || align=right | 1.3 km || 
|-id=212 bgcolor=#d6d6d6
| 321212 ||  || — || December 30, 2008 || Kitt Peak || Spacewatch || HYG || align=right | 3.6 km || 
|-id=213 bgcolor=#E9E9E9
| 321213 ||  || — || December 29, 2008 || Kitt Peak || Spacewatch || — || align=right | 2.4 km || 
|-id=214 bgcolor=#d6d6d6
| 321214 ||  || — || December 29, 2008 || Kitt Peak || Spacewatch || 7:4 || align=right | 3.8 km || 
|-id=215 bgcolor=#E9E9E9
| 321215 ||  || — || December 29, 2008 || Mount Lemmon || Mount Lemmon Survey || — || align=right | 1.2 km || 
|-id=216 bgcolor=#d6d6d6
| 321216 ||  || — || December 29, 2008 || Kitt Peak || Spacewatch || — || align=right | 4.3 km || 
|-id=217 bgcolor=#E9E9E9
| 321217 ||  || — || December 29, 2008 || Kitt Peak || Spacewatch || — || align=right | 2.6 km || 
|-id=218 bgcolor=#E9E9E9
| 321218 ||  || — || December 30, 2008 || Kitt Peak || Spacewatch || — || align=right | 1.6 km || 
|-id=219 bgcolor=#d6d6d6
| 321219 ||  || — || December 30, 2008 || Kitt Peak || Spacewatch || — || align=right | 4.1 km || 
|-id=220 bgcolor=#E9E9E9
| 321220 ||  || — || December 30, 2008 || Kitt Peak || Spacewatch || — || align=right | 2.5 km || 
|-id=221 bgcolor=#d6d6d6
| 321221 ||  || — || December 30, 2008 || Kitt Peak || Spacewatch || THM || align=right | 2.1 km || 
|-id=222 bgcolor=#d6d6d6
| 321222 ||  || — || December 31, 2008 || Kitt Peak || Spacewatch || — || align=right | 3.8 km || 
|-id=223 bgcolor=#d6d6d6
| 321223 ||  || — || December 21, 2008 || Kitt Peak || Spacewatch || KOR || align=right | 1.9 km || 
|-id=224 bgcolor=#E9E9E9
| 321224 ||  || — || December 22, 2008 || Kitt Peak || Spacewatch || — || align=right | 1.4 km || 
|-id=225 bgcolor=#d6d6d6
| 321225 ||  || — || December 21, 2008 || Mount Lemmon || Mount Lemmon Survey || — || align=right | 4.4 km || 
|-id=226 bgcolor=#E9E9E9
| 321226 ||  || — || January 2, 2009 || Mount Lemmon || Mount Lemmon Survey || HEN || align=right | 1.1 km || 
|-id=227 bgcolor=#E9E9E9
| 321227 ||  || — || January 1, 2009 || Mount Lemmon || Mount Lemmon Survey || — || align=right | 1.7 km || 
|-id=228 bgcolor=#E9E9E9
| 321228 ||  || — || January 2, 2009 || Kitt Peak || Spacewatch || — || align=right | 2.6 km || 
|-id=229 bgcolor=#fefefe
| 321229 ||  || — || January 15, 2009 || Kitt Peak || Spacewatch || — || align=right data-sort-value="0.91" | 910 m || 
|-id=230 bgcolor=#d6d6d6
| 321230 ||  || — || January 2, 2009 || Mount Lemmon || Mount Lemmon Survey || KAR || align=right | 1.1 km || 
|-id=231 bgcolor=#fefefe
| 321231 ||  || — || January 18, 2009 || Socorro || LINEAR || H || align=right data-sort-value="0.60" | 600 m || 
|-id=232 bgcolor=#fefefe
| 321232 ||  || — || January 19, 2009 || Socorro || LINEAR || — || align=right | 1.6 km || 
|-id=233 bgcolor=#E9E9E9
| 321233 ||  || — || January 17, 2009 || Catalina || CSS || — || align=right | 2.9 km || 
|-id=234 bgcolor=#d6d6d6
| 321234 ||  || — || January 16, 2009 || Kitt Peak || Spacewatch || KOR || align=right | 1.6 km || 
|-id=235 bgcolor=#d6d6d6
| 321235 ||  || — || January 16, 2009 || Kitt Peak || Spacewatch || — || align=right | 2.8 km || 
|-id=236 bgcolor=#E9E9E9
| 321236 ||  || — || January 16, 2009 || Kitt Peak || Spacewatch || — || align=right | 1.6 km || 
|-id=237 bgcolor=#fefefe
| 321237 ||  || — || January 20, 2009 || Mount Lemmon || Mount Lemmon Survey || — || align=right | 1.3 km || 
|-id=238 bgcolor=#fefefe
| 321238 ||  || — || January 31, 2009 || Socorro || LINEAR || H || align=right data-sort-value="0.86" | 860 m || 
|-id=239 bgcolor=#d6d6d6
| 321239 ||  || — || January 25, 2009 || Kitt Peak || Spacewatch || — || align=right | 3.3 km || 
|-id=240 bgcolor=#d6d6d6
| 321240 ||  || — || January 25, 2009 || Kitt Peak || Spacewatch || KOR || align=right | 1.8 km || 
|-id=241 bgcolor=#fefefe
| 321241 ||  || — || January 25, 2009 || Kitt Peak || Spacewatch || — || align=right | 1.0 km || 
|-id=242 bgcolor=#E9E9E9
| 321242 ||  || — || January 25, 2009 || Kitt Peak || Spacewatch || — || align=right data-sort-value="0.87" | 870 m || 
|-id=243 bgcolor=#d6d6d6
| 321243 ||  || — || January 25, 2009 || Kitt Peak || Spacewatch || — || align=right | 3.5 km || 
|-id=244 bgcolor=#E9E9E9
| 321244 ||  || — || January 27, 2009 || Purple Mountain || PMO NEO || — || align=right | 2.9 km || 
|-id=245 bgcolor=#d6d6d6
| 321245 ||  || — || January 29, 2009 || Mount Lemmon || Mount Lemmon Survey || — || align=right | 2.8 km || 
|-id=246 bgcolor=#fefefe
| 321246 ||  || — || January 26, 2009 || Mount Lemmon || Mount Lemmon Survey || — || align=right | 1.3 km || 
|-id=247 bgcolor=#d6d6d6
| 321247 ||  || — || January 29, 2009 || Kitt Peak || Spacewatch || — || align=right | 2.3 km || 
|-id=248 bgcolor=#d6d6d6
| 321248 ||  || — || January 31, 2009 || Kitt Peak || Spacewatch || — || align=right | 2.9 km || 
|-id=249 bgcolor=#E9E9E9
| 321249 ||  || — || January 31, 2009 || Kitt Peak || Spacewatch || AGN || align=right | 1.3 km || 
|-id=250 bgcolor=#fefefe
| 321250 ||  || — || January 31, 2009 || Mount Lemmon || Mount Lemmon Survey || — || align=right | 1.1 km || 
|-id=251 bgcolor=#d6d6d6
| 321251 ||  || — || January 30, 2009 || Mount Lemmon || Mount Lemmon Survey || — || align=right | 3.5 km || 
|-id=252 bgcolor=#d6d6d6
| 321252 ||  || — || February 1, 2009 || Mount Lemmon || Mount Lemmon Survey || — || align=right | 3.5 km || 
|-id=253 bgcolor=#d6d6d6
| 321253 ||  || — || February 2, 2009 || Mount Lemmon || Mount Lemmon Survey || — || align=right | 4.7 km || 
|-id=254 bgcolor=#fefefe
| 321254 ||  || — || February 2, 2009 || Kitt Peak || Spacewatch || — || align=right data-sort-value="0.87" | 870 m || 
|-id=255 bgcolor=#d6d6d6
| 321255 ||  || — || October 15, 2001 || Palomar || NEAT || EOS || align=right | 3.1 km || 
|-id=256 bgcolor=#fefefe
| 321256 ||  || — || February 16, 2009 || Kitt Peak || Spacewatch || — || align=right data-sort-value="0.76" | 760 m || 
|-id=257 bgcolor=#fefefe
| 321257 ||  || — || February 16, 2009 || Kitt Peak || Spacewatch || V || align=right data-sort-value="0.71" | 710 m || 
|-id=258 bgcolor=#E9E9E9
| 321258 ||  || — || February 16, 2009 || Kitt Peak || Spacewatch || — || align=right | 2.6 km || 
|-id=259 bgcolor=#fefefe
| 321259 ||  || — || February 16, 2009 || La Sagra || OAM Obs. || — || align=right data-sort-value="0.97" | 970 m || 
|-id=260 bgcolor=#fefefe
| 321260 ||  || — || February 20, 2009 || Kitt Peak || Spacewatch || MAS || align=right data-sort-value="0.81" | 810 m || 
|-id=261 bgcolor=#d6d6d6
| 321261 ||  || — || February 18, 2009 || La Sagra || OAM Obs. || HYG || align=right | 4.2 km || 
|-id=262 bgcolor=#fefefe
| 321262 ||  || — || February 27, 2009 || Dauban || F. Kugel || V || align=right data-sort-value="0.90" | 900 m || 
|-id=263 bgcolor=#E9E9E9
| 321263 ||  || — || February 22, 2009 || Kitt Peak || Spacewatch || — || align=right | 1.2 km || 
|-id=264 bgcolor=#E9E9E9
| 321264 ||  || — || February 26, 2009 || Kitt Peak || Spacewatch || — || align=right | 1.4 km || 
|-id=265 bgcolor=#fefefe
| 321265 ||  || — || February 26, 2009 || Kitt Peak || Spacewatch || — || align=right data-sort-value="0.59" | 590 m || 
|-id=266 bgcolor=#d6d6d6
| 321266 ||  || — || February 27, 2009 || Catalina || CSS || 637 || align=right | 3.1 km || 
|-id=267 bgcolor=#d6d6d6
| 321267 ||  || — || February 27, 2009 || Catalina || CSS || — || align=right | 3.9 km || 
|-id=268 bgcolor=#fefefe
| 321268 ||  || — || February 27, 2009 || Kitt Peak || Spacewatch || FLO || align=right data-sort-value="0.72" | 720 m || 
|-id=269 bgcolor=#fefefe
| 321269 ||  || — || February 26, 2009 || Kitt Peak || Spacewatch || — || align=right data-sort-value="0.85" | 850 m || 
|-id=270 bgcolor=#fefefe
| 321270 ||  || — || February 27, 2009 || Kitt Peak || Spacewatch || — || align=right data-sort-value="0.62" | 620 m || 
|-id=271 bgcolor=#E9E9E9
| 321271 ||  || — || February 20, 2009 || Catalina || CSS || — || align=right | 3.2 km || 
|-id=272 bgcolor=#fefefe
| 321272 ||  || — || February 26, 2009 || Cerro Burek || Alianza S4 Obs. || — || align=right data-sort-value="0.95" | 950 m || 
|-id=273 bgcolor=#fefefe
| 321273 ||  || — || February 20, 2009 || Kitt Peak || Spacewatch || — || align=right | 1.1 km || 
|-id=274 bgcolor=#fefefe
| 321274 ||  || — || February 19, 2009 || Kitt Peak || Spacewatch || FLO || align=right data-sort-value="0.66" | 660 m || 
|-id=275 bgcolor=#fefefe
| 321275 ||  || — || March 1, 2009 || Kitt Peak || Spacewatch || FLO || align=right data-sort-value="0.74" | 740 m || 
|-id=276 bgcolor=#fefefe
| 321276 ||  || — || March 13, 2009 || La Cañada || J. Lacruz || — || align=right data-sort-value="0.75" | 750 m || 
|-id=277 bgcolor=#E9E9E9
| 321277 ||  || — || March 1, 2009 || Kitt Peak || Spacewatch || — || align=right | 1.00 km || 
|-id=278 bgcolor=#d6d6d6
| 321278 ||  || — || March 15, 2009 || Kitt Peak || Spacewatch || — || align=right | 3.3 km || 
|-id=279 bgcolor=#d6d6d6
| 321279 ||  || — || March 15, 2009 || Kitt Peak || Spacewatch || HYG || align=right | 2.4 km || 
|-id=280 bgcolor=#d6d6d6
| 321280 ||  || — || March 15, 2009 || La Sagra || OAM Obs. || — || align=right | 4.2 km || 
|-id=281 bgcolor=#fefefe
| 321281 ||  || — || March 15, 2009 || Kitt Peak || Spacewatch || — || align=right data-sort-value="0.60" | 600 m || 
|-id=282 bgcolor=#fefefe
| 321282 ||  || — || March 3, 2009 || Kitt Peak || Spacewatch || — || align=right data-sort-value="0.58" | 580 m || 
|-id=283 bgcolor=#fefefe
| 321283 ||  || — || September 18, 2007 || Mount Lemmon || Mount Lemmon Survey || — || align=right data-sort-value="0.79" | 790 m || 
|-id=284 bgcolor=#fefefe
| 321284 ||  || — || February 19, 2009 || Kitt Peak || Spacewatch || — || align=right data-sort-value="0.80" | 800 m || 
|-id=285 bgcolor=#d6d6d6
| 321285 ||  || — || March 16, 2009 || Mount Lemmon || Mount Lemmon Survey || 7:4 || align=right | 4.5 km || 
|-id=286 bgcolor=#E9E9E9
| 321286 ||  || — || March 19, 2009 || Heppenheim || Starkenburg Obs. || — || align=right | 1.9 km || 
|-id=287 bgcolor=#fefefe
| 321287 ||  || — || March 16, 2009 || La Sagra || OAM Obs. || — || align=right data-sort-value="0.70" | 700 m || 
|-id=288 bgcolor=#fefefe
| 321288 ||  || — || March 21, 2009 || Catalina || CSS || — || align=right data-sort-value="0.71" | 710 m || 
|-id=289 bgcolor=#fefefe
| 321289 ||  || — || March 18, 2009 || Kitt Peak || Spacewatch || NYS || align=right data-sort-value="0.66" | 660 m || 
|-id=290 bgcolor=#d6d6d6
| 321290 ||  || — || March 18, 2009 || Mount Lemmon || Mount Lemmon Survey || THM || align=right | 3.1 km || 
|-id=291 bgcolor=#fefefe
| 321291 ||  || — || March 19, 2009 || Kitt Peak || Spacewatch || — || align=right | 1.1 km || 
|-id=292 bgcolor=#fefefe
| 321292 ||  || — || March 24, 2009 || Mount Lemmon || Mount Lemmon Survey || FLO || align=right data-sort-value="0.70" | 700 m || 
|-id=293 bgcolor=#fefefe
| 321293 ||  || — || November 8, 2007 || Mount Lemmon || Mount Lemmon Survey || — || align=right data-sort-value="0.98" | 980 m || 
|-id=294 bgcolor=#fefefe
| 321294 ||  || — || March 26, 2009 || Mount Lemmon || Mount Lemmon Survey || — || align=right data-sort-value="0.63" | 630 m || 
|-id=295 bgcolor=#fefefe
| 321295 ||  || — || March 19, 2009 || Catalina || CSS || H || align=right data-sort-value="0.85" | 850 m || 
|-id=296 bgcolor=#fefefe
| 321296 ||  || — || March 29, 2009 || Mount Lemmon || Mount Lemmon Survey || — || align=right data-sort-value="0.93" | 930 m || 
|-id=297 bgcolor=#d6d6d6
| 321297 ||  || — || March 29, 2009 || Mount Lemmon || Mount Lemmon Survey || — || align=right | 4.0 km || 
|-id=298 bgcolor=#fefefe
| 321298 ||  || — || March 31, 2009 || Kitt Peak || Spacewatch || FLO || align=right data-sort-value="0.50" | 500 m || 
|-id=299 bgcolor=#fefefe
| 321299 ||  || — || March 21, 2009 || Kitt Peak || Spacewatch || EUT || align=right data-sort-value="0.69" | 690 m || 
|-id=300 bgcolor=#C2FFFF
| 321300 ||  || — || March 28, 2009 || Kitt Peak || Spacewatch || L5 || align=right | 12 km || 
|}

321301–321400 

|-bgcolor=#fefefe
| 321301 ||  || — || March 18, 2009 || Kitt Peak || Spacewatch || — || align=right data-sort-value="0.66" | 660 m || 
|-id=302 bgcolor=#fefefe
| 321302 ||  || — || March 28, 2009 || Kitt Peak || Spacewatch || — || align=right data-sort-value="0.60" | 600 m || 
|-id=303 bgcolor=#fefefe
| 321303 ||  || — || March 21, 2009 || Kitt Peak || Spacewatch || V || align=right data-sort-value="0.79" | 790 m || 
|-id=304 bgcolor=#fefefe
| 321304 ||  || — || March 10, 2005 || Kitt Peak || Spacewatch || MAS || align=right data-sort-value="0.88" | 880 m || 
|-id=305 bgcolor=#fefefe
| 321305 ||  || — || April 1, 2009 || Kitt Peak || Spacewatch || — || align=right data-sort-value="0.92" | 920 m || 
|-id=306 bgcolor=#d6d6d6
| 321306 ||  || — || April 17, 2009 || Kitt Peak || Spacewatch || — || align=right | 4.1 km || 
|-id=307 bgcolor=#fefefe
| 321307 ||  || — || April 17, 2009 || Kitt Peak || Spacewatch || — || align=right data-sort-value="0.94" | 940 m || 
|-id=308 bgcolor=#d6d6d6
| 321308 ||  || — || April 18, 2009 || Kitt Peak || Spacewatch || — || align=right | 3.6 km || 
|-id=309 bgcolor=#fefefe
| 321309 ||  || — || April 18, 2009 || Mount Lemmon || Mount Lemmon Survey || — || align=right data-sort-value="0.85" | 850 m || 
|-id=310 bgcolor=#fefefe
| 321310 ||  || — || April 19, 2009 || Kitt Peak || Spacewatch || — || align=right data-sort-value="0.85" | 850 m || 
|-id=311 bgcolor=#fefefe
| 321311 ||  || — || April 19, 2009 || Heppenheim || Starkenburg Obs. || FLO || align=right data-sort-value="0.64" | 640 m || 
|-id=312 bgcolor=#E9E9E9
| 321312 ||  || — || December 22, 2003 || Kitt Peak || Spacewatch || — || align=right | 1.8 km || 
|-id=313 bgcolor=#fefefe
| 321313 ||  || — || April 18, 2009 || Kitt Peak || Spacewatch || V || align=right data-sort-value="0.83" | 830 m || 
|-id=314 bgcolor=#fefefe
| 321314 ||  || — || April 18, 2009 || Mount Lemmon || Mount Lemmon Survey || — || align=right data-sort-value="0.73" | 730 m || 
|-id=315 bgcolor=#fefefe
| 321315 ||  || — || April 21, 2009 || La Sagra || OAM Obs. || — || align=right data-sort-value="0.85" | 850 m || 
|-id=316 bgcolor=#E9E9E9
| 321316 ||  || — || April 21, 2009 || Kitt Peak || Spacewatch || — || align=right | 1.2 km || 
|-id=317 bgcolor=#fefefe
| 321317 ||  || — || April 17, 2009 || Catalina || CSS || — || align=right data-sort-value="0.90" | 900 m || 
|-id=318 bgcolor=#E9E9E9
| 321318 ||  || — || April 20, 2009 || Kitt Peak || Spacewatch || — || align=right | 1.6 km || 
|-id=319 bgcolor=#E9E9E9
| 321319 ||  || — || April 22, 2009 || Kitt Peak || Spacewatch || — || align=right | 1.7 km || 
|-id=320 bgcolor=#d6d6d6
| 321320 ||  || — || April 17, 2009 || Catalina || CSS || TIR || align=right | 3.6 km || 
|-id=321 bgcolor=#fefefe
| 321321 ||  || — || April 17, 2009 || Kitt Peak || Spacewatch || ERI || align=right | 2.0 km || 
|-id=322 bgcolor=#fefefe
| 321322 ||  || — || April 20, 2009 || Mount Lemmon || Mount Lemmon Survey || V || align=right data-sort-value="0.68" | 680 m || 
|-id=323 bgcolor=#fefefe
| 321323 ||  || — || April 23, 2009 || Kitt Peak || Spacewatch || FLO || align=right data-sort-value="0.82" | 820 m || 
|-id=324 bgcolor=#d6d6d6
| 321324 Vytautas ||  ||  || April 25, 2009 || Baldone || K. Černis, I. Eglītis || HYG || align=right | 3.3 km || 
|-id=325 bgcolor=#fefefe
| 321325 ||  || — || September 21, 2003 || Kitt Peak || Spacewatch || — || align=right data-sort-value="0.79" | 790 m || 
|-id=326 bgcolor=#fefefe
| 321326 ||  || — || April 29, 2009 || Mayhill || A. Lowe || FLO || align=right data-sort-value="0.68" | 680 m || 
|-id=327 bgcolor=#fefefe
| 321327 ||  || — || April 23, 2009 || La Sagra || OAM Obs. || FLO || align=right data-sort-value="0.70" | 700 m || 
|-id=328 bgcolor=#d6d6d6
| 321328 ||  || — || October 15, 2001 || Palomar || NEAT || 615 || align=right | 2.1 km || 
|-id=329 bgcolor=#fefefe
| 321329 ||  || — || August 29, 2006 || Kitt Peak || Spacewatch || V || align=right data-sort-value="0.71" | 710 m || 
|-id=330 bgcolor=#fefefe
| 321330 ||  || — || April 26, 2009 || Kitt Peak || Spacewatch || — || align=right data-sort-value="0.68" | 680 m || 
|-id=331 bgcolor=#fefefe
| 321331 ||  || — || April 28, 2009 || Catalina || CSS || — || align=right | 1.0 km || 
|-id=332 bgcolor=#fefefe
| 321332 ||  || — || April 19, 2009 || Mount Lemmon || Mount Lemmon Survey || — || align=right data-sort-value="0.90" | 900 m || 
|-id=333 bgcolor=#E9E9E9
| 321333 ||  || — || January 31, 2004 || Kitt Peak || Spacewatch || — || align=right | 1.8 km || 
|-id=334 bgcolor=#fefefe
| 321334 ||  || — || April 20, 2009 || Mount Lemmon || Mount Lemmon Survey || V || align=right data-sort-value="0.71" | 710 m || 
|-id=335 bgcolor=#fefefe
| 321335 ||  || — || March 4, 2005 || Mount Lemmon || Mount Lemmon Survey || — || align=right data-sort-value="0.72" | 720 m || 
|-id=336 bgcolor=#d6d6d6
| 321336 ||  || — || April 20, 2009 || Kitt Peak || Spacewatch || — || align=right | 2.8 km || 
|-id=337 bgcolor=#fefefe
| 321337 ||  || — || April 22, 2009 || Socorro || LINEAR || EUT || align=right data-sort-value="0.80" | 800 m || 
|-id=338 bgcolor=#E9E9E9
| 321338 ||  || — || May 14, 2009 || Siding Spring || SSS || — || align=right | 2.2 km || 
|-id=339 bgcolor=#E9E9E9
| 321339 ||  || — || May 15, 2009 || Kitt Peak || Spacewatch || — || align=right | 1.8 km || 
|-id=340 bgcolor=#fefefe
| 321340 ||  || — || May 1, 2009 || Cerro Burek || Alianza S4 Obs. || V || align=right data-sort-value="0.77" | 770 m || 
|-id=341 bgcolor=#fefefe
| 321341 ||  || — || May 1, 2009 || Cerro Burek || Alianza S4 Obs. || NYS || align=right data-sort-value="0.63" | 630 m || 
|-id=342 bgcolor=#fefefe
| 321342 ||  || — || May 1, 2009 || Cerro Burek || Alianza S4 Obs. || FLO || align=right data-sort-value="0.72" | 720 m || 
|-id=343 bgcolor=#fefefe
| 321343 ||  || — || May 4, 2009 || Mount Lemmon || Mount Lemmon Survey || V || align=right data-sort-value="0.66" | 660 m || 
|-id=344 bgcolor=#fefefe
| 321344 ||  || — || May 15, 2009 || Kitt Peak || Spacewatch || — || align=right data-sort-value="0.96" | 960 m || 
|-id=345 bgcolor=#fefefe
| 321345 ||  || — || April 18, 2009 || Kitt Peak || Spacewatch || NYS || align=right data-sort-value="0.63" | 630 m || 
|-id=346 bgcolor=#E9E9E9
| 321346 ||  || — || May 24, 2009 || Mayhill || A. Lowe || GEF || align=right | 1.5 km || 
|-id=347 bgcolor=#d6d6d6
| 321347 ||  || — || May 25, 2009 || Kitt Peak || Spacewatch || THM || align=right | 2.3 km || 
|-id=348 bgcolor=#E9E9E9
| 321348 ||  || — || May 25, 2009 || Kitt Peak || Spacewatch || MAR || align=right | 1.4 km || 
|-id=349 bgcolor=#fefefe
| 321349 ||  || — || May 26, 2009 || Catalina || CSS || — || align=right data-sort-value="0.81" | 810 m || 
|-id=350 bgcolor=#d6d6d6
| 321350 ||  || — || March 31, 2003 || Kitt Peak || Spacewatch || — || align=right | 2.8 km || 
|-id=351 bgcolor=#d6d6d6
| 321351 ||  || — || May 28, 2009 || Mount Lemmon || Mount Lemmon Survey || — || align=right | 2.9 km || 
|-id=352 bgcolor=#E9E9E9
| 321352 ||  || — || May 16, 2009 || Kitt Peak || Spacewatch || — || align=right | 3.0 km || 
|-id=353 bgcolor=#d6d6d6
| 321353 ||  || — || June 12, 2009 || Kitt Peak || Spacewatch || — || align=right | 4.0 km || 
|-id=354 bgcolor=#C2FFFF
| 321354 ||  || — || June 13, 2009 || Kitt Peak || Spacewatch || L5 || align=right | 13 km || 
|-id=355 bgcolor=#fefefe
| 321355 ||  || — || June 15, 2009 || Mount Lemmon || Mount Lemmon Survey || — || align=right | 1.0 km || 
|-id=356 bgcolor=#FA8072
| 321356 || 2009 MF || — || June 15, 2009 || XuYi || PMO NEO || — || align=right | 1.2 km || 
|-id=357 bgcolor=#fefefe
| 321357 Mirzakhani || 2009 MM ||  || September 3, 1994 || La Silla || E. W. Elst || — || align=right | 1.1 km || 
|-id=358 bgcolor=#fefefe
| 321358 ||  || — || October 23, 2006 || Kitt Peak || Spacewatch || NYS || align=right data-sort-value="0.70" | 700 m || 
|-id=359 bgcolor=#fefefe
| 321359 ||  || — || June 21, 2009 || Kitt Peak || Spacewatch || MAS || align=right data-sort-value="0.78" | 780 m || 
|-id=360 bgcolor=#E9E9E9
| 321360 ||  || — || October 16, 2006 || Catalina || CSS || — || align=right | 2.8 km || 
|-id=361 bgcolor=#E9E9E9
| 321361 ||  || — || June 12, 2009 || Catalina || CSS || — || align=right | 1.4 km || 
|-id=362 bgcolor=#E9E9E9
| 321362 ||  || — || June 26, 2009 || La Sagra || OAM Obs. || — || align=right | 1.4 km || 
|-id=363 bgcolor=#fefefe
| 321363 ||  || — || June 24, 2009 || Eskridge || G. Hug || — || align=right | 1.1 km || 
|-id=364 bgcolor=#fefefe
| 321364 ||  || — || July 13, 2009 || La Sagra || OAM Obs. || — || align=right | 1.2 km || 
|-id=365 bgcolor=#fefefe
| 321365 ||  || — || July 16, 2009 || La Sagra || OAM Obs. || — || align=right data-sort-value="0.76" | 760 m || 
|-id=366 bgcolor=#E9E9E9
| 321366 ||  || — || July 16, 2009 || La Sagra || OAM Obs. || ADE || align=right | 2.8 km || 
|-id=367 bgcolor=#fefefe
| 321367 ||  || — || July 16, 2009 || La Sagra || OAM Obs. || NYS || align=right data-sort-value="0.79" | 790 m || 
|-id=368 bgcolor=#E9E9E9
| 321368 ||  || — || July 19, 2009 || La Sagra || OAM Obs. || — || align=right | 2.5 km || 
|-id=369 bgcolor=#d6d6d6
| 321369 ||  || — || September 15, 2004 || Siding Spring || SSS || EUP || align=right | 5.5 km || 
|-id=370 bgcolor=#E9E9E9
| 321370 ||  || — || July 18, 2009 || La Sagra || OAM Obs. || EUN || align=right | 1.6 km || 
|-id=371 bgcolor=#E9E9E9
| 321371 ||  || — || July 19, 2009 || La Sagra || OAM Obs. || — || align=right | 3.2 km || 
|-id=372 bgcolor=#d6d6d6
| 321372 ||  || — || July 27, 2009 || Calvin-Rehoboth || Calvin–Rehoboth Obs. || — || align=right | 3.0 km || 
|-id=373 bgcolor=#d6d6d6
| 321373 ||  || — || July 29, 2009 || Črni Vrh || Črni Vrh || — || align=right | 5.8 km || 
|-id=374 bgcolor=#d6d6d6
| 321374 ||  || — || July 26, 2009 || La Sagra || OAM Obs. || — || align=right | 3.7 km || 
|-id=375 bgcolor=#E9E9E9
| 321375 ||  || — || July 27, 2009 || La Sagra || OAM Obs. || — || align=right | 1.5 km || 
|-id=376 bgcolor=#d6d6d6
| 321376 ||  || — || March 26, 2007 || Mount Lemmon || Mount Lemmon Survey || — || align=right | 4.2 km || 
|-id=377 bgcolor=#C2FFFF
| 321377 ||  || — || July 27, 2009 || Kitt Peak || Spacewatch || L4 || align=right | 15 km || 
|-id=378 bgcolor=#fefefe
| 321378 ||  || — || July 28, 2009 || Kitt Peak || Spacewatch || — || align=right | 1.2 km || 
|-id=379 bgcolor=#d6d6d6
| 321379 ||  || — || August 25, 2004 || Kitt Peak || Spacewatch || — || align=right | 3.4 km || 
|-id=380 bgcolor=#d6d6d6
| 321380 ||  || — || July 28, 2009 || Kitt Peak || Spacewatch || — || align=right | 4.1 km || 
|-id=381 bgcolor=#fefefe
| 321381 ||  || — || July 25, 2009 || La Sagra || OAM Obs. || — || align=right | 1.2 km || 
|-id=382 bgcolor=#d6d6d6
| 321382 ||  || — || July 27, 2009 || Kitt Peak || Spacewatch || BRA || align=right | 1.7 km || 
|-id=383 bgcolor=#E9E9E9
| 321383 ||  || — || August 15, 2009 || Altschwendt || W. Ries || AER || align=right | 1.8 km || 
|-id=384 bgcolor=#fefefe
| 321384 ||  || — || August 13, 2009 || La Sagra || OAM Obs. || ERI || align=right | 2.5 km || 
|-id=385 bgcolor=#fefefe
| 321385 ||  || — || August 2, 2009 || Hibiscus || N. Teamo || NYS || align=right data-sort-value="0.64" | 640 m || 
|-id=386 bgcolor=#fefefe
| 321386 ||  || — || August 15, 2009 || La Sagra || OAM Obs. || NYS || align=right data-sort-value="0.88" | 880 m || 
|-id=387 bgcolor=#E9E9E9
| 321387 ||  || — || December 14, 2006 || Kitt Peak || Spacewatch || — || align=right | 3.4 km || 
|-id=388 bgcolor=#d6d6d6
| 321388 ||  || — || August 15, 2009 || Kitt Peak || Spacewatch || THM || align=right | 2.6 km || 
|-id=389 bgcolor=#d6d6d6
| 321389 ||  || — || August 15, 2009 || Catalina || CSS || CHA || align=right | 3.0 km || 
|-id=390 bgcolor=#d6d6d6
| 321390 ||  || — || August 15, 2009 || Kitt Peak || Spacewatch || — || align=right | 3.6 km || 
|-id=391 bgcolor=#E9E9E9
| 321391 ||  || — || August 15, 2009 || Catalina || CSS || — || align=right | 1.4 km || 
|-id=392 bgcolor=#d6d6d6
| 321392 ||  || — || August 15, 2009 || Kitt Peak || Spacewatch || — || align=right | 2.4 km || 
|-id=393 bgcolor=#E9E9E9
| 321393 ||  || — || August 15, 2009 || Kitt Peak || Spacewatch || AGN || align=right | 1.4 km || 
|-id=394 bgcolor=#E9E9E9
| 321394 ||  || — || August 15, 2009 || Kitt Peak || Spacewatch || EUN || align=right | 1.4 km || 
|-id=395 bgcolor=#d6d6d6
| 321395 ||  || — || August 15, 2009 || Kitt Peak || Spacewatch || — || align=right | 3.9 km || 
|-id=396 bgcolor=#d6d6d6
| 321396 ||  || — || August 15, 2009 || Kitt Peak || Spacewatch || — || align=right | 3.0 km || 
|-id=397 bgcolor=#d6d6d6
| 321397 ||  || — || August 15, 2009 || Kitt Peak || Spacewatch || HYG || align=right | 3.0 km || 
|-id=398 bgcolor=#d6d6d6
| 321398 ||  || — || August 15, 2009 || Kitt Peak || Spacewatch || — || align=right | 3.5 km || 
|-id=399 bgcolor=#d6d6d6
| 321399 ||  || — || August 15, 2009 || La Sagra || OAM Obs. || — || align=right | 3.1 km || 
|-id=400 bgcolor=#d6d6d6
| 321400 ||  || — || August 15, 2009 || Kitt Peak || Spacewatch || CHA || align=right | 2.7 km || 
|}

321401–321500 

|-bgcolor=#d6d6d6
| 321401 ||  || — || August 15, 2009 || Kitt Peak || Spacewatch || — || align=right | 4.9 km || 
|-id=402 bgcolor=#d6d6d6
| 321402 ||  || — || August 15, 2009 || Kitt Peak || Spacewatch || — || align=right | 3.1 km || 
|-id=403 bgcolor=#d6d6d6
| 321403 ||  || — || August 16, 2009 || Altschwendt || W. Ries || — || align=right | 3.4 km || 
|-id=404 bgcolor=#E9E9E9
| 321404 || 2009 QP || — || August 16, 2009 || Vicques || M. Ory || — || align=right | 2.8 km || 
|-id=405 bgcolor=#d6d6d6
| 321405 Ingehorst ||  ||  || August 16, 2009 || Taunus || R. Kling, U. Zimmer || — || align=right | 4.8 km || 
|-id=406 bgcolor=#C2FFFF
| 321406 ||  || — || August 17, 2009 || Kitt Peak || Spacewatch || L4 || align=right | 12 km || 
|-id=407 bgcolor=#d6d6d6
| 321407 ||  || — || August 17, 2009 || Kitt Peak || Spacewatch || — || align=right | 4.4 km || 
|-id=408 bgcolor=#E9E9E9
| 321408 ||  || — || August 17, 2009 || Catalina || CSS || — || align=right | 3.6 km || 
|-id=409 bgcolor=#E9E9E9
| 321409 ||  || — || August 17, 2009 || Hibiscus || Hibiscus Obs. || — || align=right | 1.5 km || 
|-id=410 bgcolor=#d6d6d6
| 321410 ||  || — || August 18, 2009 || Vicques || M. Ory || HYG || align=right | 3.8 km || 
|-id=411 bgcolor=#d6d6d6
| 321411 ||  || — || August 17, 2009 || Tiki || N. Teamo || — || align=right | 2.5 km || 
|-id=412 bgcolor=#d6d6d6
| 321412 ||  || — || August 22, 2009 || Dauban || F. Kugel || ALA || align=right | 4.4 km || 
|-id=413 bgcolor=#d6d6d6
| 321413 ||  || — || August 16, 2009 || Kitt Peak || Spacewatch || EOS || align=right | 2.6 km || 
|-id=414 bgcolor=#d6d6d6
| 321414 ||  || — || August 16, 2009 || Kitt Peak || Spacewatch || EOS || align=right | 2.5 km || 
|-id=415 bgcolor=#E9E9E9
| 321415 ||  || — || August 16, 2009 || Kitt Peak || Spacewatch || — || align=right | 2.0 km || 
|-id=416 bgcolor=#d6d6d6
| 321416 ||  || — || August 16, 2009 || Kitt Peak || Spacewatch || CHA || align=right | 2.0 km || 
|-id=417 bgcolor=#d6d6d6
| 321417 ||  || — || August 16, 2009 || Kitt Peak || Spacewatch || EOS || align=right | 2.4 km || 
|-id=418 bgcolor=#E9E9E9
| 321418 ||  || — || August 16, 2009 || Kitt Peak || Spacewatch || — || align=right | 2.4 km || 
|-id=419 bgcolor=#d6d6d6
| 321419 ||  || — || August 17, 2009 || Kitt Peak || Spacewatch || — || align=right | 3.1 km || 
|-id=420 bgcolor=#d6d6d6
| 321420 ||  || — || August 19, 2009 || La Sagra || OAM Obs. || — || align=right | 3.6 km || 
|-id=421 bgcolor=#E9E9E9
| 321421 ||  || — || August 19, 2009 || La Sagra || OAM Obs. || JUN || align=right | 1.1 km || 
|-id=422 bgcolor=#d6d6d6
| 321422 ||  || — || August 19, 2009 || La Sagra || OAM Obs. || — || align=right | 2.7 km || 
|-id=423 bgcolor=#E9E9E9
| 321423 ||  || — || August 16, 2009 || La Sagra || OAM Obs. || XIZ || align=right | 1.8 km || 
|-id=424 bgcolor=#fefefe
| 321424 ||  || — || August 17, 2009 || La Sagra || OAM Obs. || MAS || align=right data-sort-value="0.86" | 860 m || 
|-id=425 bgcolor=#d6d6d6
| 321425 ||  || — || August 18, 2009 || La Sagra || OAM Obs. || — || align=right | 2.7 km || 
|-id=426 bgcolor=#E9E9E9
| 321426 ||  || — || August 20, 2009 || La Sagra || OAM Obs. || — || align=right | 1.9 km || 
|-id=427 bgcolor=#d6d6d6
| 321427 ||  || — || August 26, 2009 || Catalina || CSS || — || align=right | 5.8 km || 
|-id=428 bgcolor=#d6d6d6
| 321428 ||  || — || August 24, 2009 || La Sagra || OAM Obs. || — || align=right | 4.9 km || 
|-id=429 bgcolor=#d6d6d6
| 321429 ||  || — || August 26, 2009 || Plana || F. Fratev || EOS || align=right | 2.3 km || 
|-id=430 bgcolor=#E9E9E9
| 321430 ||  || — || August 29, 2009 || La Sagra || OAM Obs. || — || align=right | 4.2 km || 
|-id=431 bgcolor=#d6d6d6
| 321431 ||  || — || August 29, 2009 || La Sagra || OAM Obs. || EOS || align=right | 2.8 km || 
|-id=432 bgcolor=#d6d6d6
| 321432 ||  || — || August 20, 2009 || Kitt Peak || Spacewatch || BRA || align=right | 2.1 km || 
|-id=433 bgcolor=#E9E9E9
| 321433 ||  || — || August 26, 2009 || La Sagra || OAM Obs. || — || align=right | 3.0 km || 
|-id=434 bgcolor=#fefefe
| 321434 ||  || — || August 26, 2009 || La Sagra || OAM Obs. || NYS || align=right data-sort-value="0.78" | 780 m || 
|-id=435 bgcolor=#C2FFFF
| 321435 ||  || — || April 1, 2003 || Apache Point || SDSS || L4 || align=right | 13 km || 
|-id=436 bgcolor=#E9E9E9
| 321436 ||  || — || August 27, 2009 || La Sagra || OAM Obs. || — || align=right | 2.9 km || 
|-id=437 bgcolor=#d6d6d6
| 321437 ||  || — || August 28, 2009 || Kitt Peak || Spacewatch || HYG || align=right | 2.8 km || 
|-id=438 bgcolor=#d6d6d6
| 321438 ||  || — || August 28, 2009 || La Sagra || OAM Obs. || — || align=right | 4.9 km || 
|-id=439 bgcolor=#d6d6d6
| 321439 ||  || — || August 29, 2009 || Kitt Peak || Spacewatch || EOS || align=right | 2.2 km || 
|-id=440 bgcolor=#E9E9E9
| 321440 ||  || — || August 20, 2009 || Kitt Peak || Spacewatch || NEM || align=right | 2.8 km || 
|-id=441 bgcolor=#d6d6d6
| 321441 ||  || — || August 20, 2009 || Kitt Peak || Spacewatch || — || align=right | 3.3 km || 
|-id=442 bgcolor=#d6d6d6
| 321442 ||  || — || August 28, 2009 || Catalina || CSS || — || align=right | 3.9 km || 
|-id=443 bgcolor=#E9E9E9
| 321443 ||  || — || August 18, 2009 || Kitt Peak || Spacewatch || DOR || align=right | 3.5 km || 
|-id=444 bgcolor=#d6d6d6
| 321444 ||  || — || August 16, 2009 || Kitt Peak || Spacewatch || — || align=right | 3.6 km || 
|-id=445 bgcolor=#d6d6d6
| 321445 ||  || — || August 16, 2009 || Kitt Peak || Spacewatch || — || align=right | 3.2 km || 
|-id=446 bgcolor=#E9E9E9
| 321446 ||  || — || August 16, 2009 || Kitt Peak || Spacewatch || — || align=right | 1.1 km || 
|-id=447 bgcolor=#d6d6d6
| 321447 ||  || — || August 16, 2009 || Kitt Peak || Spacewatch || THM || align=right | 2.9 km || 
|-id=448 bgcolor=#E9E9E9
| 321448 ||  || — || August 19, 2009 || Kitt Peak || Spacewatch || HEN || align=right | 1.3 km || 
|-id=449 bgcolor=#d6d6d6
| 321449 ||  || — || August 22, 2009 || La Sagra || OAM Obs. || LUT || align=right | 5.3 km || 
|-id=450 bgcolor=#d6d6d6
| 321450 ||  || — || August 20, 2009 || La Sagra || OAM Obs. || — || align=right | 2.8 km || 
|-id=451 bgcolor=#d6d6d6
| 321451 ||  || — || March 20, 2002 || Kitt Peak || Spacewatch || — || align=right | 3.1 km || 
|-id=452 bgcolor=#d6d6d6
| 321452 ||  || — || September 10, 2009 || Bisei SG Center || BATTeRS || — || align=right | 4.5 km || 
|-id=453 bgcolor=#d6d6d6
| 321453 Alexmarieann ||  ||  || September 10, 2009 || ESA OGS || M. Busch, R. Kresken || Tj (2.95) || align=right | 4.7 km || 
|-id=454 bgcolor=#E9E9E9
| 321454 ||  || — || September 10, 2009 || Catalina || CSS || — || align=right | 3.2 km || 
|-id=455 bgcolor=#E9E9E9
| 321455 ||  || — || September 12, 2009 || Kitt Peak || Spacewatch || — || align=right | 2.5 km || 
|-id=456 bgcolor=#E9E9E9
| 321456 ||  || — || September 12, 2009 || Kitt Peak || Spacewatch || — || align=right | 1.3 km || 
|-id=457 bgcolor=#E9E9E9
| 321457 ||  || — || September 15, 2009 || Kitt Peak || Spacewatch || WIT || align=right | 1.2 km || 
|-id=458 bgcolor=#d6d6d6
| 321458 ||  || — || August 14, 2009 || La Sagra || OAM Obs. || — || align=right | 5.4 km || 
|-id=459 bgcolor=#d6d6d6
| 321459 ||  || — || September 15, 2009 || Kitt Peak || Spacewatch || — || align=right | 3.9 km || 
|-id=460 bgcolor=#d6d6d6
| 321460 ||  || — || September 10, 2009 || Catalina || CSS || MEL || align=right | 6.0 km || 
|-id=461 bgcolor=#fefefe
| 321461 ||  || — || September 11, 2009 || Catalina || CSS || FLO || align=right data-sort-value="0.77" | 770 m || 
|-id=462 bgcolor=#fefefe
| 321462 ||  || — || September 15, 2009 || Kitt Peak || Spacewatch || V || align=right | 1.0 km || 
|-id=463 bgcolor=#E9E9E9
| 321463 ||  || — || September 15, 2009 || Kitt Peak || Spacewatch || — || align=right | 2.4 km || 
|-id=464 bgcolor=#d6d6d6
| 321464 ||  || — || September 15, 2009 || Kitt Peak || Spacewatch || — || align=right | 3.9 km || 
|-id=465 bgcolor=#d6d6d6
| 321465 ||  || — || September 15, 2009 || Kitt Peak || Spacewatch || — || align=right | 3.8 km || 
|-id=466 bgcolor=#d6d6d6
| 321466 ||  || — || September 15, 2009 || Kitt Peak || Spacewatch || — || align=right | 3.8 km || 
|-id=467 bgcolor=#d6d6d6
| 321467 ||  || — || September 15, 2009 || Kitt Peak || Spacewatch || — || align=right | 3.8 km || 
|-id=468 bgcolor=#d6d6d6
| 321468 ||  || — || September 15, 2009 || Kitt Peak || Spacewatch || URS || align=right | 4.4 km || 
|-id=469 bgcolor=#E9E9E9
| 321469 ||  || — || September 15, 2009 || Kitt Peak || Spacewatch || DOR || align=right | 3.2 km || 
|-id=470 bgcolor=#d6d6d6
| 321470 ||  || — || September 15, 2009 || Kitt Peak || Spacewatch || — || align=right | 4.0 km || 
|-id=471 bgcolor=#E9E9E9
| 321471 ||  || — || September 15, 2009 || Kitt Peak || Spacewatch || — || align=right | 1.3 km || 
|-id=472 bgcolor=#d6d6d6
| 321472 ||  || — || September 15, 2009 || Kitt Peak || Spacewatch || — || align=right | 4.9 km || 
|-id=473 bgcolor=#d6d6d6
| 321473 ||  || — || August 16, 2009 || Catalina || CSS || — || align=right | 5.2 km || 
|-id=474 bgcolor=#d6d6d6
| 321474 ||  || — || September 11, 2009 || La Sagra || OAM Obs. || TIR || align=right | 4.1 km || 
|-id=475 bgcolor=#d6d6d6
| 321475 ||  || — || September 10, 2009 || Catalina || CSS || — || align=right | 3.9 km || 
|-id=476 bgcolor=#d6d6d6
| 321476 ||  || — || September 15, 2009 || Kitt Peak || Spacewatch || — || align=right | 3.5 km || 
|-id=477 bgcolor=#E9E9E9
| 321477 ||  || — || September 15, 2009 || Siding Spring || SSS || — || align=right | 3.6 km || 
|-id=478 bgcolor=#E9E9E9
| 321478 ||  || — || September 15, 2009 || Mount Lemmon || Mount Lemmon Survey || MRX || align=right | 1.3 km || 
|-id=479 bgcolor=#d6d6d6
| 321479 ||  || — || September 15, 2009 || Mount Lemmon || Mount Lemmon Survey || HYG || align=right | 3.5 km || 
|-id=480 bgcolor=#d6d6d6
| 321480 ||  || — || September 10, 2009 || ESA OGS || ESA OGS || EOS || align=right | 2.5 km || 
|-id=481 bgcolor=#d6d6d6
| 321481 ||  || — || September 15, 2009 || Kitt Peak || Spacewatch || THM || align=right | 2.4 km || 
|-id=482 bgcolor=#d6d6d6
| 321482 ||  || — || September 15, 2009 || Kitt Peak || Spacewatch || — || align=right | 4.0 km || 
|-id=483 bgcolor=#d6d6d6
| 321483 ||  || — || September 16, 2009 || Mount Lemmon || Mount Lemmon Survey || EOS || align=right | 2.6 km || 
|-id=484 bgcolor=#d6d6d6
| 321484 Marsaalam ||  ||  || September 17, 2009 || Zelenchukskaya || T. V. Kryachko || URS || align=right | 4.1 km || 
|-id=485 bgcolor=#fefefe
| 321485 Cross ||  ||  || September 18, 2009 || Saint-Sulpice || B. Christophe || MAS || align=right | 1.0 km || 
|-id=486 bgcolor=#d6d6d6
| 321486 ||  || — || September 16, 2009 || Kitt Peak || Spacewatch || — || align=right | 4.7 km || 
|-id=487 bgcolor=#d6d6d6
| 321487 ||  || — || March 16, 2007 || Kitt Peak || Spacewatch || — || align=right | 3.1 km || 
|-id=488 bgcolor=#d6d6d6
| 321488 ||  || — || September 16, 2009 || Kitt Peak || Spacewatch || — || align=right | 2.7 km || 
|-id=489 bgcolor=#d6d6d6
| 321489 ||  || — || September 16, 2009 || Kitt Peak || Spacewatch || — || align=right | 3.7 km || 
|-id=490 bgcolor=#d6d6d6
| 321490 ||  || — || September 17, 2009 || Mount Lemmon || Mount Lemmon Survey || — || align=right | 3.5 km || 
|-id=491 bgcolor=#E9E9E9
| 321491 ||  || — || September 17, 2009 || Kitt Peak || Spacewatch || — || align=right | 1.9 km || 
|-id=492 bgcolor=#E9E9E9
| 321492 ||  || — || September 17, 2009 || Mount Lemmon || Mount Lemmon Survey || — || align=right | 1.5 km || 
|-id=493 bgcolor=#d6d6d6
| 321493 ||  || — || September 17, 2009 || Kitt Peak || Spacewatch || — || align=right | 4.5 km || 
|-id=494 bgcolor=#E9E9E9
| 321494 ||  || — || April 13, 2004 || Kitt Peak || Spacewatch || — || align=right | 1.1 km || 
|-id=495 bgcolor=#d6d6d6
| 321495 ||  || — || September 17, 2009 || Mount Lemmon || Mount Lemmon Survey || — || align=right | 3.4 km || 
|-id=496 bgcolor=#E9E9E9
| 321496 ||  || — || September 17, 2009 || Kitt Peak || Spacewatch || — || align=right | 1.5 km || 
|-id=497 bgcolor=#E9E9E9
| 321497 ||  || — || September 18, 2009 || Kitt Peak || Spacewatch || — || align=right | 1.6 km || 
|-id=498 bgcolor=#d6d6d6
| 321498 ||  || — || September 22, 2009 || Dauban || F. Kugel || — || align=right | 3.6 km || 
|-id=499 bgcolor=#d6d6d6
| 321499 ||  || — || September 18, 2009 || Kitt Peak || Spacewatch || — || align=right | 3.2 km || 
|-id=500 bgcolor=#fefefe
| 321500 ||  || — || September 18, 2009 || Kitt Peak || Spacewatch || — || align=right data-sort-value="0.78" | 780 m || 
|}

321501–321600 

|-bgcolor=#fefefe
| 321501 ||  || — || September 18, 2009 || Kitt Peak || Spacewatch || — || align=right | 2.9 km || 
|-id=502 bgcolor=#d6d6d6
| 321502 ||  || — || September 18, 2009 || Kitt Peak || Spacewatch || — || align=right | 3.8 km || 
|-id=503 bgcolor=#E9E9E9
| 321503 ||  || — || September 20, 2009 || Kitt Peak || Spacewatch || WIT || align=right | 1.4 km || 
|-id=504 bgcolor=#d6d6d6
| 321504 ||  || — || September 20, 2009 || Kitt Peak || Spacewatch || — || align=right | 3.9 km || 
|-id=505 bgcolor=#E9E9E9
| 321505 ||  || — || July 29, 2009 || Catalina || CSS || EUN || align=right | 1.6 km || 
|-id=506 bgcolor=#d6d6d6
| 321506 ||  || — || September 25, 2009 || Sierra Stars || R. Matson || — || align=right | 3.9 km || 
|-id=507 bgcolor=#d6d6d6
| 321507 ||  || — || September 26, 2009 || Modra || Š. Gajdoš, J. Világi || — || align=right | 3.0 km || 
|-id=508 bgcolor=#E9E9E9
| 321508 ||  || — || March 23, 2003 || Palomar || NEAT || — || align=right | 3.3 km || 
|-id=509 bgcolor=#d6d6d6
| 321509 ||  || — || September 21, 2009 || Catalina || CSS || VER || align=right | 3.9 km || 
|-id=510 bgcolor=#d6d6d6
| 321510 ||  || — || September 21, 2009 || Mount Lemmon || Mount Lemmon Survey || — || align=right | 3.2 km || 
|-id=511 bgcolor=#fefefe
| 321511 ||  || — || October 6, 2005 || Mount Lemmon || Mount Lemmon Survey || — || align=right | 1.3 km || 
|-id=512 bgcolor=#E9E9E9
| 321512 ||  || — || September 22, 2009 || Kitt Peak || Spacewatch || GER || align=right | 2.0 km || 
|-id=513 bgcolor=#C2FFFF
| 321513 ||  || — || September 6, 2008 || Kitt Peak || Spacewatch || L4 || align=right | 12 km || 
|-id=514 bgcolor=#d6d6d6
| 321514 ||  || — || September 22, 2009 || Catalina || CSS || — || align=right | 4.1 km || 
|-id=515 bgcolor=#fefefe
| 321515 ||  || — || December 13, 2006 || Mount Lemmon || Mount Lemmon Survey || — || align=right data-sort-value="0.75" | 750 m || 
|-id=516 bgcolor=#d6d6d6
| 321516 ||  || — || September 22, 2009 || Kitt Peak || Spacewatch || — || align=right | 3.3 km || 
|-id=517 bgcolor=#fefefe
| 321517 ||  || — || September 22, 2009 || Kitt Peak || Spacewatch || — || align=right data-sort-value="0.92" | 920 m || 
|-id=518 bgcolor=#E9E9E9
| 321518 ||  || — || September 23, 2009 || Kitt Peak || Spacewatch || — || align=right | 2.7 km || 
|-id=519 bgcolor=#E9E9E9
| 321519 ||  || — || September 23, 2009 || Kitt Peak || Spacewatch || — || align=right | 2.1 km || 
|-id=520 bgcolor=#d6d6d6
| 321520 ||  || — || September 24, 2009 || Kitt Peak || Spacewatch || — || align=right | 3.9 km || 
|-id=521 bgcolor=#d6d6d6
| 321521 ||  || — || August 26, 1998 || Kitt Peak || Spacewatch || EOS || align=right | 2.5 km || 
|-id=522 bgcolor=#d6d6d6
| 321522 ||  || — || September 18, 2009 || Mount Lemmon || Mount Lemmon Survey || KAR || align=right | 1.3 km || 
|-id=523 bgcolor=#d6d6d6
| 321523 ||  || — || September 19, 2009 || Catalina || CSS || — || align=right | 3.3 km || 
|-id=524 bgcolor=#d6d6d6
| 321524 ||  || — || September 19, 2009 || Catalina || CSS || HYG || align=right | 3.7 km || 
|-id=525 bgcolor=#fefefe
| 321525 ||  || — || September 18, 2009 || Mount Lemmon || Mount Lemmon Survey || — || align=right | 1.1 km || 
|-id=526 bgcolor=#C2FFFF
| 321526 ||  || — || September 18, 2009 || Kitt Peak || Spacewatch || L4 || align=right | 9.7 km || 
|-id=527 bgcolor=#d6d6d6
| 321527 ||  || — || December 4, 2004 || Anderson Mesa || LONEOS || — || align=right | 4.9 km || 
|-id=528 bgcolor=#E9E9E9
| 321528 ||  || — || April 20, 2004 || Kitt Peak || Spacewatch || — || align=right | 2.1 km || 
|-id=529 bgcolor=#d6d6d6
| 321529 ||  || — || September 24, 2009 || Catalina || CSS || — || align=right | 3.5 km || 
|-id=530 bgcolor=#d6d6d6
| 321530 ||  || — || September 18, 2009 || Kitt Peak || Spacewatch || — || align=right | 4.0 km || 
|-id=531 bgcolor=#d6d6d6
| 321531 ||  || — || December 1, 1994 || Kitt Peak || Spacewatch || — || align=right | 3.7 km || 
|-id=532 bgcolor=#d6d6d6
| 321532 ||  || — || September 27, 2003 || Kitt Peak || Spacewatch || HYG || align=right | 4.1 km || 
|-id=533 bgcolor=#d6d6d6
| 321533 ||  || — || January 25, 2006 || Kitt Peak || Spacewatch || — || align=right | 2.6 km || 
|-id=534 bgcolor=#d6d6d6
| 321534 ||  || — || September 23, 2009 || Mount Lemmon || Mount Lemmon Survey || CHA || align=right | 2.9 km || 
|-id=535 bgcolor=#d6d6d6
| 321535 ||  || — || September 23, 2009 || Mount Lemmon || Mount Lemmon Survey || — || align=right | 4.0 km || 
|-id=536 bgcolor=#d6d6d6
| 321536 ||  || — || October 13, 1999 || Kitt Peak || Spacewatch || — || align=right | 3.9 km || 
|-id=537 bgcolor=#E9E9E9
| 321537 ||  || — || September 24, 2009 || Kitt Peak || Spacewatch || EUN || align=right | 1.8 km || 
|-id=538 bgcolor=#d6d6d6
| 321538 ||  || — || December 23, 2000 || Apache Point || SDSS || — || align=right | 5.0 km || 
|-id=539 bgcolor=#fefefe
| 321539 ||  || — || September 25, 2009 || Kitt Peak || Spacewatch || NYS || align=right data-sort-value="0.60" | 600 m || 
|-id=540 bgcolor=#d6d6d6
| 321540 ||  || — || September 25, 2009 || Kitt Peak || Spacewatch || — || align=right | 4.1 km || 
|-id=541 bgcolor=#E9E9E9
| 321541 ||  || — || September 25, 2009 || Kitt Peak || Spacewatch || — || align=right | 1.5 km || 
|-id=542 bgcolor=#d6d6d6
| 321542 ||  || — || September 25, 2009 || Kitt Peak || Spacewatch || KOR || align=right | 1.5 km || 
|-id=543 bgcolor=#fefefe
| 321543 ||  || — || September 25, 2009 || Kitt Peak || Spacewatch || NYS || align=right data-sort-value="0.66" | 660 m || 
|-id=544 bgcolor=#d6d6d6
| 321544 ||  || — || September 25, 2009 || Kitt Peak || Spacewatch || — || align=right | 2.9 km || 
|-id=545 bgcolor=#d6d6d6
| 321545 ||  || — || September 25, 2009 || Kitt Peak || Spacewatch || 629 || align=right | 1.8 km || 
|-id=546 bgcolor=#d6d6d6
| 321546 ||  || — || September 25, 2009 || Kitt Peak || Spacewatch || — || align=right | 4.2 km || 
|-id=547 bgcolor=#E9E9E9
| 321547 ||  || — || September 25, 2009 || Kitt Peak || Spacewatch || NEM || align=right | 2.8 km || 
|-id=548 bgcolor=#E9E9E9
| 321548 ||  || — || September 25, 2009 || Kitt Peak || Spacewatch || — || align=right | 2.2 km || 
|-id=549 bgcolor=#E9E9E9
| 321549 ||  || — || September 25, 2009 || Kitt Peak || Spacewatch || — || align=right | 1.8 km || 
|-id=550 bgcolor=#d6d6d6
| 321550 ||  || — || September 25, 2009 || Kitt Peak || Spacewatch || — || align=right | 3.6 km || 
|-id=551 bgcolor=#d6d6d6
| 321551 ||  || — || September 25, 2009 || Kitt Peak || Spacewatch || HYG || align=right | 4.2 km || 
|-id=552 bgcolor=#fefefe
| 321552 ||  || — || September 25, 2009 || Kitt Peak || Spacewatch || FLO || align=right data-sort-value="0.72" | 720 m || 
|-id=553 bgcolor=#E9E9E9
| 321553 ||  || — || September 19, 2009 || Mount Lemmon || Mount Lemmon Survey || — || align=right | 2.4 km || 
|-id=554 bgcolor=#d6d6d6
| 321554 ||  || — || September 21, 2009 || Kitt Peak || Spacewatch || — || align=right | 2.9 km || 
|-id=555 bgcolor=#E9E9E9
| 321555 ||  || — || September 16, 2009 || Kitt Peak || Spacewatch || EUN || align=right | 1.9 km || 
|-id=556 bgcolor=#d6d6d6
| 321556 ||  || — || September 17, 2009 || Catalina || CSS || IMH || align=right | 4.9 km || 
|-id=557 bgcolor=#E9E9E9
| 321557 ||  || — || September 27, 2009 || Mount Lemmon || Mount Lemmon Survey || — || align=right | 3.4 km || 
|-id=558 bgcolor=#d6d6d6
| 321558 ||  || — || September 28, 2009 || Catalina || CSS || EOS || align=right | 4.0 km || 
|-id=559 bgcolor=#d6d6d6
| 321559 ||  || — || September 28, 2009 || Catalina || CSS || EOS || align=right | 3.6 km || 
|-id=560 bgcolor=#d6d6d6
| 321560 ||  || — || September 18, 2009 || Kitt Peak || Spacewatch || — || align=right | 4.1 km || 
|-id=561 bgcolor=#d6d6d6
| 321561 ||  || — || September 17, 2009 || Kitt Peak || Spacewatch || — || align=right | 2.7 km || 
|-id=562 bgcolor=#d6d6d6
| 321562 ||  || — || September 23, 2009 || Kitt Peak || Spacewatch || — || align=right | 2.4 km || 
|-id=563 bgcolor=#E9E9E9
| 321563 ||  || — || September 17, 2009 || Mount Lemmon || Mount Lemmon Survey || PAD || align=right | 1.8 km || 
|-id=564 bgcolor=#E9E9E9
| 321564 ||  || — || September 19, 2009 || Mount Lemmon || Mount Lemmon Survey || INO || align=right | 2.1 km || 
|-id=565 bgcolor=#fefefe
| 321565 ||  || — || September 19, 2009 || Mount Lemmon || Mount Lemmon Survey || — || align=right | 1.1 km || 
|-id=566 bgcolor=#d6d6d6
| 321566 ||  || — || September 17, 2009 || Kitt Peak || Spacewatch || — || align=right | 3.9 km || 
|-id=567 bgcolor=#d6d6d6
| 321567 ||  || — || September 18, 2009 || Kitt Peak || Spacewatch || — || align=right | 3.7 km || 
|-id=568 bgcolor=#d6d6d6
| 321568 ||  || — || September 17, 2009 || Kitt Peak || Spacewatch || — || align=right | 4.2 km || 
|-id=569 bgcolor=#E9E9E9
| 321569 ||  || — || September 20, 2009 || Bisei SG Center || BATTeRS || PAD || align=right | 2.3 km || 
|-id=570 bgcolor=#C2FFFF
| 321570 ||  || — || September 13, 1996 || La Silla || UDTS || L4HEK || align=right | 14 km || 
|-id=571 bgcolor=#d6d6d6
| 321571 ||  || — || September 18, 2009 || Kitt Peak || Spacewatch || HYG || align=right | 3.2 km || 
|-id=572 bgcolor=#d6d6d6
| 321572 ||  || — || October 1, 2009 || Kitt Peak || Spacewatch || — || align=right | 4.1 km || 
|-id=573 bgcolor=#d6d6d6
| 321573 ||  || — || October 14, 2009 || Marly || P. Kocher || — || align=right | 3.3 km || 
|-id=574 bgcolor=#d6d6d6
| 321574 ||  || — || October 10, 2009 || Dauban || F. Kugel || EOS || align=right | 2.0 km || 
|-id=575 bgcolor=#E9E9E9
| 321575 ||  || — || October 15, 2009 || Dauban || F. Kugel || — || align=right | 3.0 km || 
|-id=576 bgcolor=#d6d6d6
| 321576 ||  || — || October 11, 2009 || La Sagra || OAM Obs. || — || align=right | 3.6 km || 
|-id=577 bgcolor=#d6d6d6
| 321577 Keanureeves ||  ||  || October 14, 2009 || Zelenchukskaya S || T. V. Kryachko || — || align=right | 3.2 km || 
|-id=578 bgcolor=#E9E9E9
| 321578 ||  || — || October 15, 2009 || Catalina || CSS || — || align=right | 1.6 km || 
|-id=579 bgcolor=#d6d6d6
| 321579 ||  || — || October 14, 2009 || Catalina || CSS || CHA || align=right | 2.8 km || 
|-id=580 bgcolor=#C2FFFF
| 321580 ||  || — || October 11, 2009 || Mount Lemmon || Mount Lemmon Survey || L4 || align=right | 8.3 km || 
|-id=581 bgcolor=#E9E9E9
| 321581 ||  || — || October 15, 2009 || Mount Lemmon || Mount Lemmon Survey || — || align=right | 2.4 km || 
|-id=582 bgcolor=#E9E9E9
| 321582 ||  || — || October 16, 2009 || Mount Lemmon || Mount Lemmon Survey || — || align=right | 2.6 km || 
|-id=583 bgcolor=#E9E9E9
| 321583 ||  || — || October 16, 2009 || Mount Lemmon || Mount Lemmon Survey || — || align=right | 2.7 km || 
|-id=584 bgcolor=#C2FFFF
| 321584 ||  || — || October 23, 2009 || Marly || P. Kocher || L4 || align=right | 10 km || 
|-id=585 bgcolor=#E9E9E9
| 321585 ||  || — || October 18, 2009 || La Sagra || OAM Obs. || — || align=right | 2.0 km || 
|-id=586 bgcolor=#d6d6d6
| 321586 ||  || — || March 18, 2002 || Kitt Peak || Spacewatch || KOR || align=right | 1.5 km || 
|-id=587 bgcolor=#d6d6d6
| 321587 ||  || — || October 17, 2009 || Mount Lemmon || Mount Lemmon Survey || — || align=right | 5.0 km || 
|-id=588 bgcolor=#d6d6d6
| 321588 ||  || — || October 17, 2009 || Mount Lemmon || Mount Lemmon Survey || — || align=right | 2.9 km || 
|-id=589 bgcolor=#d6d6d6
| 321589 ||  || — || October 22, 2009 || Catalina || CSS || — || align=right | 3.4 km || 
|-id=590 bgcolor=#C2FFFF
| 321590 ||  || — || October 23, 2009 || Mount Lemmon || Mount Lemmon Survey || L4 || align=right | 13 km || 
|-id=591 bgcolor=#d6d6d6
| 321591 ||  || — || October 24, 2009 || Mount Lemmon || Mount Lemmon Survey || — || align=right | 4.3 km || 
|-id=592 bgcolor=#E9E9E9
| 321592 ||  || — || August 24, 2000 || Socorro || LINEAR || — || align=right | 1.7 km || 
|-id=593 bgcolor=#d6d6d6
| 321593 ||  || — || October 23, 2009 || Mount Lemmon || Mount Lemmon Survey || — || align=right | 3.6 km || 
|-id=594 bgcolor=#d6d6d6
| 321594 ||  || — || October 23, 2009 || Kitt Peak || Spacewatch || — || align=right | 5.3 km || 
|-id=595 bgcolor=#d6d6d6
| 321595 ||  || — || October 22, 2009 || Mount Lemmon || Mount Lemmon Survey || TEL || align=right | 2.0 km || 
|-id=596 bgcolor=#d6d6d6
| 321596 ||  || — || September 17, 2003 || Kitt Peak || Spacewatch || — || align=right | 2.7 km || 
|-id=597 bgcolor=#C2FFFF
| 321597 ||  || — || October 22, 2009 || Catalina || CSS || L4 || align=right | 12 km || 
|-id=598 bgcolor=#d6d6d6
| 321598 ||  || — || October 16, 2009 || Catalina || CSS || EOS || align=right | 2.7 km || 
|-id=599 bgcolor=#C2FFFF
| 321599 ||  || — || October 18, 2009 || Mount Lemmon || Mount Lemmon Survey || L4 || align=right | 7.1 km || 
|-id=600 bgcolor=#d6d6d6
| 321600 ||  || — || October 26, 2009 || Kitt Peak || Spacewatch || — || align=right | 2.8 km || 
|}

321601–321700 

|-bgcolor=#d6d6d6
| 321601 ||  || — || October 27, 2009 || Catalina || CSS || — || align=right | 4.4 km || 
|-id=602 bgcolor=#d6d6d6
| 321602 ||  || — || October 18, 2009 || Mount Lemmon || Mount Lemmon Survey || — || align=right | 3.5 km || 
|-id=603 bgcolor=#C2FFFF
| 321603 ||  || — || October 23, 2009 || Kitt Peak || Spacewatch || L4 || align=right | 9.5 km || 
|-id=604 bgcolor=#C2FFFF
| 321604 ||  || — || August 23, 2007 || Kitt Peak || Spacewatch || L4 || align=right | 12 km || 
|-id=605 bgcolor=#d6d6d6
| 321605 ||  || — || November 8, 2009 || Mount Lemmon || Mount Lemmon Survey || 3:2 || align=right | 5.4 km || 
|-id=606 bgcolor=#d6d6d6
| 321606 ||  || — || November 9, 2009 || Mount Lemmon || Mount Lemmon Survey || — || align=right | 3.1 km || 
|-id=607 bgcolor=#d6d6d6
| 321607 ||  || — || November 10, 2009 || Mount Lemmon || Mount Lemmon Survey || — || align=right | 4.5 km || 
|-id=608 bgcolor=#fefefe
| 321608 ||  || — || November 11, 2009 || Socorro || LINEAR || FLO || align=right data-sort-value="0.90" | 900 m || 
|-id=609 bgcolor=#d6d6d6
| 321609 ||  || — || November 8, 2009 || Kitt Peak || Spacewatch || — || align=right | 3.3 km || 
|-id=610 bgcolor=#C2FFFF
| 321610 ||  || — || October 14, 2009 || Mount Lemmon || Mount Lemmon Survey || L4 || align=right | 10 km || 
|-id=611 bgcolor=#C2FFFF
| 321611 ||  || — || October 26, 2009 || Kitt Peak || Spacewatch || L4 || align=right | 16 km || 
|-id=612 bgcolor=#fefefe
| 321612 ||  || — || November 8, 2009 || Kitt Peak || Spacewatch || MAS || align=right data-sort-value="0.90" | 900 m || 
|-id=613 bgcolor=#C2FFFF
| 321613 ||  || — || November 10, 2009 || Kitt Peak || Spacewatch || L4 || align=right | 12 km || 
|-id=614 bgcolor=#E9E9E9
| 321614 ||  || — || November 8, 2009 || Catalina || CSS || — || align=right | 2.2 km || 
|-id=615 bgcolor=#d6d6d6
| 321615 ||  || — || November 10, 2009 || Kitt Peak || Spacewatch || — || align=right | 4.6 km || 
|-id=616 bgcolor=#C2FFFF
| 321616 ||  || — || November 8, 2009 || Mount Lemmon || Mount Lemmon Survey || L4 || align=right | 11 km || 
|-id=617 bgcolor=#d6d6d6
| 321617 ||  || — || November 11, 2004 || Kitt Peak || Spacewatch || KOR || align=right | 1.6 km || 
|-id=618 bgcolor=#d6d6d6
| 321618 ||  || — || November 17, 2009 || Kitt Peak || Spacewatch || 7:4 || align=right | 4.3 km || 
|-id=619 bgcolor=#fefefe
| 321619 ||  || — || October 20, 2006 || Mount Lemmon || Mount Lemmon Survey || — || align=right | 1.2 km || 
|-id=620 bgcolor=#E9E9E9
| 321620 ||  || — || March 26, 2003 || Kitt Peak || Spacewatch || — || align=right | 1.6 km || 
|-id=621 bgcolor=#fefefe
| 321621 ||  || — || November 17, 2009 || Mount Lemmon || Mount Lemmon Survey || V || align=right data-sort-value="0.96" | 960 m || 
|-id=622 bgcolor=#d6d6d6
| 321622 ||  || — || November 18, 2009 || Kitt Peak || Spacewatch || — || align=right | 4.5 km || 
|-id=623 bgcolor=#E9E9E9
| 321623 ||  || — || November 19, 2009 || Jarnac || Jarnac Obs. || — || align=right | 2.2 km || 
|-id=624 bgcolor=#fefefe
| 321624 ||  || — || November 19, 2009 || Kitt Peak || Spacewatch || V || align=right | 1.0 km || 
|-id=625 bgcolor=#C2FFFF
| 321625 ||  || — || November 21, 2009 || Kitt Peak || Spacewatch || L4 || align=right | 9.3 km || 
|-id=626 bgcolor=#d6d6d6
| 321626 ||  || — || November 21, 2009 || Kitt Peak || Spacewatch || THM || align=right | 2.8 km || 
|-id=627 bgcolor=#C2FFFF
| 321627 ||  || — || October 2, 2008 || Kitt Peak || Spacewatch || L4 || align=right | 7.4 km || 
|-id=628 bgcolor=#C2FFFF
| 321628 ||  || — || November 17, 2009 || Mount Lemmon || Mount Lemmon Survey || L4 || align=right | 7.9 km || 
|-id=629 bgcolor=#E9E9E9
| 321629 ||  || — || November 20, 2009 || Kitt Peak || Spacewatch || HEN || align=right | 1.1 km || 
|-id=630 bgcolor=#d6d6d6
| 321630 ||  || — || November 19, 2009 || Mount Lemmon || Mount Lemmon Survey || HIL3:2 || align=right | 8.1 km || 
|-id=631 bgcolor=#C2FFFF
| 321631 ||  || — || October 8, 2008 || Kitt Peak || Spacewatch || L4 || align=right | 7.9 km || 
|-id=632 bgcolor=#d6d6d6
| 321632 ||  || — || November 25, 2009 || La Sagra || OAM Obs. || — || align=right | 3.7 km || 
|-id=633 bgcolor=#fefefe
| 321633 ||  || — || February 21, 2001 || Kitt Peak || Spacewatch || — || align=right data-sort-value="0.79" | 790 m || 
|-id=634 bgcolor=#E9E9E9
| 321634 ||  || — || October 21, 1995 || Kitt Peak || Spacewatch || — || align=right | 2.6 km || 
|-id=635 bgcolor=#d6d6d6
| 321635 ||  || — || November 22, 2009 || Kitt Peak || Spacewatch || — || align=right | 7.2 km || 
|-id=636 bgcolor=#E9E9E9
| 321636 ||  || — || November 16, 2009 || Mount Lemmon || Mount Lemmon Survey || — || align=right | 2.3 km || 
|-id=637 bgcolor=#d6d6d6
| 321637 ||  || — || October 10, 2004 || Kitt Peak || Spacewatch || KOR || align=right | 1.6 km || 
|-id=638 bgcolor=#fefefe
| 321638 ||  || — || February 17, 2004 || Kitt Peak || Spacewatch || — || align=right data-sort-value="0.75" | 750 m || 
|-id=639 bgcolor=#d6d6d6
| 321639 ||  || — || July 15, 2002 || Palomar || NEAT || — || align=right | 5.0 km || 
|-id=640 bgcolor=#E9E9E9
| 321640 ||  || — || December 10, 2009 || Mount Lemmon || Mount Lemmon Survey || — || align=right | 1.2 km || 
|-id=641 bgcolor=#fefefe
| 321641 ||  || — || January 5, 2010 || Kitt Peak || Spacewatch || — || align=right | 1.1 km || 
|-id=642 bgcolor=#E9E9E9
| 321642 ||  || — || November 4, 2004 || Kitt Peak || Spacewatch || — || align=right | 1.7 km || 
|-id=643 bgcolor=#E9E9E9
| 321643 ||  || — || January 6, 2010 || Mount Lemmon || Mount Lemmon Survey || HNA || align=right | 2.7 km || 
|-id=644 bgcolor=#d6d6d6
| 321644 ||  || — || February 1, 2005 || Kitt Peak || Spacewatch || — || align=right | 6.8 km || 
|-id=645 bgcolor=#d6d6d6
| 321645 ||  || — || January 8, 2010 || Kitt Peak || Spacewatch || NAE || align=right | 4.1 km || 
|-id=646 bgcolor=#d6d6d6
| 321646 ||  || — || January 11, 2010 || Kitt Peak || Spacewatch || — || align=right | 3.4 km || 
|-id=647 bgcolor=#d6d6d6
| 321647 ||  || — || January 6, 2010 || Socorro || LINEAR || — || align=right | 2.6 km || 
|-id=648 bgcolor=#E9E9E9
| 321648 ||  || — || January 12, 2010 || Mount Lemmon || Mount Lemmon Survey || — || align=right | 3.0 km || 
|-id=649 bgcolor=#d6d6d6
| 321649 ||  || — || March 24, 2001 || Anderson Mesa || LONEOS || LIX || align=right | 6.4 km || 
|-id=650 bgcolor=#E9E9E9
| 321650 ||  || — || January 21, 2010 || La Sagra || OAM Obs. || — || align=right | 2.3 km || 
|-id=651 bgcolor=#C2FFFF
| 321651 ||  || — || February 14, 2002 || Kitt Peak || Spacewatch || L4ERY || align=right | 8.6 km || 
|-id=652 bgcolor=#C2FFFF
| 321652 ||  || — || March 9, 2002 || Kitt Peak || Spacewatch || L4 || align=right | 14 km || 
|-id=653 bgcolor=#C2FFFF
| 321653 ||  || — || October 27, 2009 || Mount Lemmon || Mount Lemmon Survey || L4 || align=right | 8.7 km || 
|-id=654 bgcolor=#E9E9E9
| 321654 ||  || — || January 21, 2010 || WISE || WISE || PAD || align=right | 2.6 km || 
|-id=655 bgcolor=#d6d6d6
| 321655 ||  || — || January 22, 2010 || WISE || WISE || — || align=right | 5.5 km || 
|-id=656 bgcolor=#C2FFFF
| 321656 ||  || — || October 2, 2009 || Mount Lemmon || Mount Lemmon Survey || L4 || align=right | 10 km || 
|-id=657 bgcolor=#C2FFFF
| 321657 ||  || — || April 10, 2002 || Palomar || NEAT || L4 || align=right | 16 km || 
|-id=658 bgcolor=#d6d6d6
| 321658 ||  || — || February 12, 2010 || Mayhill || A. Lowe || — || align=right | 4.7 km || 
|-id=659 bgcolor=#E9E9E9
| 321659 ||  || — || February 9, 2010 || Kitt Peak || Spacewatch || — || align=right | 1.9 km || 
|-id=660 bgcolor=#E9E9E9
| 321660 ||  || — || February 9, 2010 || Kitt Peak || Spacewatch || AST || align=right | 1.9 km || 
|-id=661 bgcolor=#fefefe
| 321661 ||  || — || August 24, 2000 || Socorro || LINEAR || — || align=right | 1.0 km || 
|-id=662 bgcolor=#E9E9E9
| 321662 ||  || — || February 14, 2010 || Socorro || LINEAR || — || align=right | 3.5 km || 
|-id=663 bgcolor=#E9E9E9
| 321663 ||  || — || February 14, 2010 || Socorro || LINEAR || — || align=right | 3.6 km || 
|-id=664 bgcolor=#E9E9E9
| 321664 ||  || — || February 13, 2010 || Mount Lemmon || Mount Lemmon Survey || — || align=right | 2.5 km || 
|-id=665 bgcolor=#d6d6d6
| 321665 ||  || — || February 13, 2010 || Mount Lemmon || Mount Lemmon Survey || THM || align=right | 2.5 km || 
|-id=666 bgcolor=#E9E9E9
| 321666 ||  || — || February 13, 2010 || Mount Lemmon || Mount Lemmon Survey || — || align=right | 2.7 km || 
|-id=667 bgcolor=#E9E9E9
| 321667 ||  || — || February 13, 2010 || Mount Lemmon || Mount Lemmon Survey || — || align=right | 1.1 km || 
|-id=668 bgcolor=#fefefe
| 321668 ||  || — || February 14, 2010 || Kitt Peak || Spacewatch || — || align=right data-sort-value="0.87" | 870 m || 
|-id=669 bgcolor=#fefefe
| 321669 ||  || — || August 28, 2000 || Socorro || LINEAR || ERI || align=right | 2.0 km || 
|-id=670 bgcolor=#E9E9E9
| 321670 ||  || — || February 9, 2010 || Kitt Peak || Spacewatch || — || align=right | 3.2 km || 
|-id=671 bgcolor=#d6d6d6
| 321671 ||  || — || February 9, 2010 || Kitt Peak || Spacewatch || — || align=right | 2.8 km || 
|-id=672 bgcolor=#d6d6d6
| 321672 ||  || — || June 17, 2006 || Kitt Peak || Spacewatch || HYG || align=right | 2.8 km || 
|-id=673 bgcolor=#E9E9E9
| 321673 ||  || — || February 14, 2010 || Haleakala || Pan-STARRS || — || align=right | 2.9 km || 
|-id=674 bgcolor=#C2FFFF
| 321674 ||  || — || September 22, 2008 || Catalina || CSS || L4 || align=right | 11 km || 
|-id=675 bgcolor=#E9E9E9
| 321675 ||  || — || December 29, 2000 || Kitt Peak || Spacewatch || EUN || align=right | 2.1 km || 
|-id=676 bgcolor=#C2FFFF
| 321676 ||  || — || August 27, 2006 || Kitt Peak || Spacewatch || L4 || align=right | 13 km || 
|-id=677 bgcolor=#E9E9E9
| 321677 ||  || — || February 16, 2010 || Mount Lemmon || Mount Lemmon Survey || — || align=right | 3.3 km || 
|-id=678 bgcolor=#d6d6d6
| 321678 ||  || — || June 27, 2004 || Kitt Peak || Spacewatch || 3:2 || align=right | 5.3 km || 
|-id=679 bgcolor=#fefefe
| 321679 ||  || — || February 17, 2010 || Kitt Peak || Spacewatch || NYS || align=right | 1.8 km || 
|-id=680 bgcolor=#E9E9E9
| 321680 ||  || — || February 19, 2010 || Kitt Peak || Spacewatch || — || align=right | 1.4 km || 
|-id=681 bgcolor=#E9E9E9
| 321681 ||  || — || March 4, 2010 || Kitt Peak || Spacewatch || — || align=right | 1.3 km || 
|-id=682 bgcolor=#fefefe
| 321682 ||  || — || September 15, 1998 || Kitt Peak || Spacewatch || FLO || align=right data-sort-value="0.61" | 610 m || 
|-id=683 bgcolor=#d6d6d6
| 321683 ||  || — || March 12, 2010 || Kitt Peak || Spacewatch || CRO || align=right | 4.6 km || 
|-id=684 bgcolor=#d6d6d6
| 321684 ||  || — || February 27, 2004 || Kitt Peak || M. W. Buie || — || align=right | 3.5 km || 
|-id=685 bgcolor=#E9E9E9
| 321685 ||  || — || September 15, 2007 || Kitt Peak || Spacewatch || — || align=right | 2.5 km || 
|-id=686 bgcolor=#E9E9E9
| 321686 ||  || — || March 15, 2010 || Kitt Peak || Spacewatch || — || align=right | 1.5 km || 
|-id=687 bgcolor=#d6d6d6
| 321687 ||  || — || March 15, 2010 || Mount Lemmon || Mount Lemmon Survey || — || align=right | 2.7 km || 
|-id=688 bgcolor=#fefefe
| 321688 ||  || — || March 12, 2010 || Catalina || CSS || V || align=right data-sort-value="0.84" | 840 m || 
|-id=689 bgcolor=#E9E9E9
| 321689 ||  || — || March 12, 2010 || Kitt Peak || Spacewatch || — || align=right | 1.7 km || 
|-id=690 bgcolor=#E9E9E9
| 321690 ||  || — || March 13, 2010 || Kitt Peak || Spacewatch || — || align=right | 2.9 km || 
|-id=691 bgcolor=#E9E9E9
| 321691 ||  || — || March 14, 2010 || Kitt Peak || Spacewatch || AGN || align=right | 1.7 km || 
|-id=692 bgcolor=#E9E9E9
| 321692 ||  || — || March 12, 2010 || Mount Lemmon || Mount Lemmon Survey || — || align=right | 3.0 km || 
|-id=693 bgcolor=#d6d6d6
| 321693 ||  || — || March 13, 2010 || Kitt Peak || Spacewatch || — || align=right | 2.9 km || 
|-id=694 bgcolor=#E9E9E9
| 321694 ||  || — || March 13, 2010 || Kitt Peak || Spacewatch || — || align=right | 1.8 km || 
|-id=695 bgcolor=#d6d6d6
| 321695 ||  || — || March 4, 2010 || Kitt Peak || Spacewatch || — || align=right | 2.9 km || 
|-id=696 bgcolor=#d6d6d6
| 321696 ||  || — || March 13, 2010 || Catalina || CSS || TIR || align=right | 2.9 km || 
|-id=697 bgcolor=#d6d6d6
| 321697 ||  || — || March 12, 2010 || Mount Lemmon || Mount Lemmon Survey || — || align=right | 3.4 km || 
|-id=698 bgcolor=#E9E9E9
| 321698 ||  || — || March 13, 2010 || Kitt Peak || Spacewatch || — || align=right | 2.5 km || 
|-id=699 bgcolor=#d6d6d6
| 321699 ||  || — || March 10, 2010 || La Sagra || OAM Obs. || — || align=right | 3.7 km || 
|-id=700 bgcolor=#d6d6d6
| 321700 ||  || — || September 13, 2007 || Anderson Mesa || LONEOS || — || align=right | 5.0 km || 
|}

321701–321800 

|-bgcolor=#E9E9E9
| 321701 ||  || — || March 16, 2010 || Kitt Peak || Spacewatch || PAD || align=right | 3.0 km || 
|-id=702 bgcolor=#E9E9E9
| 321702 ||  || — || March 18, 2010 || Mount Lemmon || Mount Lemmon Survey || HEN || align=right | 1.1 km || 
|-id=703 bgcolor=#E9E9E9
| 321703 ||  || — || March 21, 2010 || Mount Lemmon || Mount Lemmon Survey || — || align=right | 1.3 km || 
|-id=704 bgcolor=#d6d6d6
| 321704 ||  || — || April 5, 2000 || Kitt Peak || Spacewatch || KOR || align=right | 1.7 km || 
|-id=705 bgcolor=#fefefe
| 321705 ||  || — || February 25, 2006 || Mount Lemmon || Mount Lemmon Survey || — || align=right | 2.0 km || 
|-id=706 bgcolor=#C2FFFF
| 321706 ||  || — || November 1, 2005 || Kitt Peak || Spacewatch || L5ENM || align=right | 16 km || 
|-id=707 bgcolor=#fefefe
| 321707 ||  || — || April 6, 2010 || Kitt Peak || Spacewatch || — || align=right data-sort-value="0.83" | 830 m || 
|-id=708 bgcolor=#d6d6d6
| 321708 ||  || — || April 10, 2010 || Kitt Peak || Spacewatch || — || align=right | 4.7 km || 
|-id=709 bgcolor=#E9E9E9
| 321709 ||  || — || April 10, 2010 || Kitt Peak || Spacewatch || HOF || align=right | 2.7 km || 
|-id=710 bgcolor=#fefefe
| 321710 ||  || — || April 10, 2010 || Mount Lemmon || Mount Lemmon Survey || MAS || align=right data-sort-value="0.88" | 880 m || 
|-id=711 bgcolor=#fefefe
| 321711 ||  || — || March 15, 2010 || Catalina || CSS || V || align=right data-sort-value="0.99" | 990 m || 
|-id=712 bgcolor=#E9E9E9
| 321712 ||  || — || February 2, 2009 || Mount Lemmon || Mount Lemmon Survey || — || align=right | 2.8 km || 
|-id=713 bgcolor=#d6d6d6
| 321713 ||  || — || April 11, 2010 || Kitt Peak || Spacewatch || HYG || align=right | 5.1 km || 
|-id=714 bgcolor=#E9E9E9
| 321714 ||  || — || April 7, 2010 || Mount Lemmon || Mount Lemmon Survey || — || align=right | 3.1 km || 
|-id=715 bgcolor=#fefefe
| 321715 ||  || — || January 26, 2006 || Kitt Peak || Spacewatch || V || align=right data-sort-value="0.66" | 660 m || 
|-id=716 bgcolor=#C2FFFF
| 321716 ||  || — || February 14, 2005 || Kitt Peak || Spacewatch || L5 || align=right | 12 km || 
|-id=717 bgcolor=#E9E9E9
| 321717 ||  || — || September 18, 2003 || Kitt Peak || Spacewatch || — || align=right | 1.5 km || 
|-id=718 bgcolor=#E9E9E9
| 321718 ||  || — || April 28, 2010 || WISE || WISE || — || align=right | 3.1 km || 
|-id=719 bgcolor=#d6d6d6
| 321719 ||  || — || October 11, 2001 || Socorro || LINEAR || — || align=right | 4.6 km || 
|-id=720 bgcolor=#E9E9E9
| 321720 ||  || — || May 8, 2010 || Mount Lemmon || Mount Lemmon Survey || — || align=right | 1.4 km || 
|-id=721 bgcolor=#d6d6d6
| 321721 ||  || — || May 9, 2010 || Mount Lemmon || Mount Lemmon Survey || — || align=right | 3.6 km || 
|-id=722 bgcolor=#d6d6d6
| 321722 ||  || — || January 29, 2009 || Mount Lemmon || Mount Lemmon Survey || — || align=right | 3.7 km || 
|-id=723 bgcolor=#d6d6d6
| 321723 ||  || — || May 20, 2010 || WISE || WISE || — || align=right | 5.2 km || 
|-id=724 bgcolor=#E9E9E9
| 321724 ||  || — || May 21, 2010 || WISE || WISE || — || align=right | 2.7 km || 
|-id=725 bgcolor=#fefefe
| 321725 ||  || — || May 21, 2010 || WISE || WISE || — || align=right | 2.1 km || 
|-id=726 bgcolor=#fefefe
| 321726 ||  || — || May 22, 2010 || WISE || WISE || NYS || align=right | 2.2 km || 
|-id=727 bgcolor=#fefefe
| 321727 ||  || — || May 27, 2010 || WISE || WISE || NYS || align=right | 1.8 km || 
|-id=728 bgcolor=#fefefe
| 321728 ||  || — || April 2, 1997 || Kitt Peak || Spacewatch || — || align=right data-sort-value="0.77" | 770 m || 
|-id=729 bgcolor=#fefefe
| 321729 ||  || — || June 2, 2010 || Nogales || Tenagra II Obs. || V || align=right data-sort-value="0.92" | 920 m || 
|-id=730 bgcolor=#d6d6d6
| 321730 ||  || — || June 1, 2010 || WISE || WISE || — || align=right | 3.8 km || 
|-id=731 bgcolor=#d6d6d6
| 321731 ||  || — || June 8, 2010 || WISE || WISE || — || align=right | 2.8 km || 
|-id=732 bgcolor=#fefefe
| 321732 ||  || — || November 22, 2003 || Catalina || CSS || — || align=right | 2.8 km || 
|-id=733 bgcolor=#d6d6d6
| 321733 ||  || — || February 4, 2003 || Anderson Mesa || LONEOS || EOS || align=right | 3.3 km || 
|-id=734 bgcolor=#fefefe
| 321734 ||  || — || June 11, 2010 || WISE || WISE || NYS || align=right | 1.8 km || 
|-id=735 bgcolor=#d6d6d6
| 321735 ||  || — || December 21, 2005 || Siding Spring || SSS || EUP || align=right | 4.5 km || 
|-id=736 bgcolor=#fefefe
| 321736 ||  || — || June 13, 2010 || Mount Lemmon || Mount Lemmon Survey || V || align=right | 1.1 km || 
|-id=737 bgcolor=#fefefe
| 321737 ||  || — || June 18, 2010 || WISE || WISE || — || align=right | 1.4 km || 
|-id=738 bgcolor=#E9E9E9
| 321738 ||  || — || February 9, 2008 || Kitt Peak || Spacewatch || HOF || align=right | 2.5 km || 
|-id=739 bgcolor=#d6d6d6
| 321739 ||  || — || June 22, 2010 || WISE || WISE || — || align=right | 2.8 km || 
|-id=740 bgcolor=#d6d6d6
| 321740 ||  || — || October 1, 2005 || Mount Lemmon || Mount Lemmon Survey || — || align=right | 3.7 km || 
|-id=741 bgcolor=#E9E9E9
| 321741 ||  || — || June 16, 2010 || WISE || WISE || — || align=right | 1.9 km || 
|-id=742 bgcolor=#E9E9E9
| 321742 ||  || — || June 16, 2010 || WISE || WISE || BAR || align=right | 1.9 km || 
|-id=743 bgcolor=#d6d6d6
| 321743 ||  || — || June 25, 2010 || WISE || WISE || 627 || align=right | 3.4 km || 
|-id=744 bgcolor=#E9E9E9
| 321744 ||  || — || June 25, 2010 || WISE || WISE || — || align=right | 2.7 km || 
|-id=745 bgcolor=#E9E9E9
| 321745 ||  || — || January 10, 2003 || Socorro || LINEAR || ADE || align=right | 2.8 km || 
|-id=746 bgcolor=#E9E9E9
| 321746 ||  || — || June 30, 2010 || WISE || WISE || DOR || align=right | 3.2 km || 
|-id=747 bgcolor=#d6d6d6
| 321747 ||  || — || June 30, 2010 || WISE || WISE || HYG || align=right | 3.1 km || 
|-id=748 bgcolor=#fefefe
| 321748 ||  || — || July 4, 2010 || Kitt Peak || Spacewatch || — || align=right data-sort-value="0.74" | 740 m || 
|-id=749 bgcolor=#fefefe
| 321749 ||  || — || July 25, 2003 || Palomar || NEAT || — || align=right | 1.0 km || 
|-id=750 bgcolor=#d6d6d6
| 321750 ||  || — || April 28, 2004 || Kitt Peak || Spacewatch || — || align=right | 3.1 km || 
|-id=751 bgcolor=#E9E9E9
| 321751 ||  || — || March 21, 1999 || Apache Point || SDSS || — || align=right | 2.9 km || 
|-id=752 bgcolor=#E9E9E9
| 321752 ||  || — || December 15, 2006 || Socorro || LINEAR || EUN || align=right | 2.4 km || 
|-id=753 bgcolor=#E9E9E9
| 321753 ||  || — || November 18, 2001 || Kitt Peak || Spacewatch || AST || align=right | 3.4 km || 
|-id=754 bgcolor=#d6d6d6
| 321754 ||  || — || July 8, 2010 || WISE || WISE || — || align=right | 3.5 km || 
|-id=755 bgcolor=#fefefe
| 321755 ||  || — || July 7, 2010 || Mount Lemmon || Mount Lemmon Survey || — || align=right data-sort-value="0.90" | 900 m || 
|-id=756 bgcolor=#d6d6d6
| 321756 ||  || — || July 1, 2010 || WISE || WISE || EOS || align=right | 4.9 km || 
|-id=757 bgcolor=#E9E9E9
| 321757 ||  || — || November 2, 2006 || Mount Lemmon || Mount Lemmon Survey || — || align=right | 2.6 km || 
|-id=758 bgcolor=#fefefe
| 321758 ||  || — || September 5, 2000 || Socorro || LINEAR || FLO || align=right | 1.2 km || 
|-id=759 bgcolor=#E9E9E9
| 321759 ||  || — || July 12, 2010 || WISE || WISE || NEM || align=right | 3.1 km || 
|-id=760 bgcolor=#E9E9E9
| 321760 ||  || — || July 12, 2010 || WISE || WISE || — || align=right | 2.6 km || 
|-id=761 bgcolor=#E9E9E9
| 321761 ||  || — || October 18, 2001 || Kitt Peak || Spacewatch || NEM || align=right | 2.1 km || 
|-id=762 bgcolor=#d6d6d6
| 321762 ||  || — || July 13, 2010 || WISE || WISE || — || align=right | 3.6 km || 
|-id=763 bgcolor=#d6d6d6
| 321763 ||  || — || September 16, 2004 || Siding Spring || SSS || VER || align=right | 5.9 km || 
|-id=764 bgcolor=#E9E9E9
| 321764 ||  || — || July 16, 2010 || WISE || WISE || — || align=right | 3.4 km || 
|-id=765 bgcolor=#d6d6d6
| 321765 ||  || — || November 29, 2005 || Catalina || CSS || — || align=right | 3.0 km || 
|-id=766 bgcolor=#fefefe
| 321766 ||  || — || May 15, 2009 || Kitt Peak || Spacewatch || — || align=right | 1.8 km || 
|-id=767 bgcolor=#d6d6d6
| 321767 ||  || — || July 18, 2010 || WISE || WISE || — || align=right | 2.6 km || 
|-id=768 bgcolor=#d6d6d6
| 321768 ||  || — || October 30, 2005 || Mount Lemmon || Mount Lemmon Survey || — || align=right | 4.4 km || 
|-id=769 bgcolor=#E9E9E9
| 321769 ||  || — || July 26, 1996 || Haleakala || AMOS || — || align=right | 1.6 km || 
|-id=770 bgcolor=#E9E9E9
| 321770 ||  || — || July 20, 2010 || WISE || WISE || — || align=right | 2.0 km || 
|-id=771 bgcolor=#d6d6d6
| 321771 ||  || — || March 20, 1999 || Apache Point || SDSS || 3:2 || align=right | 7.1 km || 
|-id=772 bgcolor=#E9E9E9
| 321772 ||  || — || December 14, 2006 || Kitt Peak || Spacewatch || — || align=right | 2.2 km || 
|-id=773 bgcolor=#E9E9E9
| 321773 ||  || — || August 30, 2005 || Kitt Peak || Spacewatch || HOF || align=right | 2.7 km || 
|-id=774 bgcolor=#E9E9E9
| 321774 ||  || — || August 26, 2005 || Palomar || NEAT || — || align=right | 3.4 km || 
|-id=775 bgcolor=#d6d6d6
| 321775 ||  || — || March 18, 2007 || Kitt Peak || Spacewatch || MEL || align=right | 3.1 km || 
|-id=776 bgcolor=#d6d6d6
| 321776 ||  || — || July 25, 2010 || WISE || WISE || HYG || align=right | 3.3 km || 
|-id=777 bgcolor=#d6d6d6
| 321777 ||  || — || July 26, 2010 || WISE || WISE || HYG || align=right | 4.0 km || 
|-id=778 bgcolor=#d6d6d6
| 321778 ||  || — || December 22, 2000 || Kitt Peak || Spacewatch || — || align=right | 3.2 km || 
|-id=779 bgcolor=#d6d6d6
| 321779 ||  || — || July 26, 2010 || WISE || WISE || — || align=right | 4.3 km || 
|-id=780 bgcolor=#d6d6d6
| 321780 ||  || — || July 26, 2010 || WISE || WISE || — || align=right | 3.3 km || 
|-id=781 bgcolor=#E9E9E9
| 321781 ||  || — || May 7, 2005 || Kitt Peak || Spacewatch || ADE || align=right | 1.7 km || 
|-id=782 bgcolor=#d6d6d6
| 321782 ||  || — || July 27, 2010 || WISE || WISE || — || align=right | 4.1 km || 
|-id=783 bgcolor=#d6d6d6
| 321783 ||  || — || April 4, 2008 || Kitt Peak || Spacewatch || — || align=right | 3.2 km || 
|-id=784 bgcolor=#E9E9E9
| 321784 ||  || — || December 11, 2006 || Kitt Peak || Spacewatch || — || align=right | 2.3 km || 
|-id=785 bgcolor=#E9E9E9
| 321785 ||  || — || November 13, 2006 || Catalina || CSS || KRM || align=right | 2.3 km || 
|-id=786 bgcolor=#d6d6d6
| 321786 ||  || — || March 21, 1999 || Apache Point || SDSS || — || align=right | 3.9 km || 
|-id=787 bgcolor=#d6d6d6
| 321787 ||  || — || March 29, 2008 || Kitt Peak || Spacewatch || — || align=right | 3.2 km || 
|-id=788 bgcolor=#E9E9E9
| 321788 ||  || — || July 29, 2010 || WISE || WISE || MIT || align=right | 4.0 km || 
|-id=789 bgcolor=#E9E9E9
| 321789 ||  || — || October 19, 2006 || Catalina || CSS || — || align=right | 2.2 km || 
|-id=790 bgcolor=#E9E9E9
| 321790 ||  || — || August 31, 2005 || Kitt Peak || Spacewatch || — || align=right | 2.8 km || 
|-id=791 bgcolor=#d6d6d6
| 321791 ||  || — || January 27, 2007 || Mount Lemmon || Mount Lemmon Survey || — || align=right | 2.7 km || 
|-id=792 bgcolor=#fefefe
| 321792 ||  || — || January 11, 2008 || Mount Lemmon || Mount Lemmon Survey || — || align=right | 1.2 km || 
|-id=793 bgcolor=#fefefe
| 321793 ||  || — || December 6, 2008 || Mount Lemmon || Mount Lemmon Survey || H || align=right | 1.1 km || 
|-id=794 bgcolor=#d6d6d6
| 321794 ||  || — || September 9, 2004 || Socorro || LINEAR || URS || align=right | 4.9 km || 
|-id=795 bgcolor=#E9E9E9
| 321795 ||  || — || June 10, 2005 || Kitt Peak || Spacewatch || — || align=right | 1.5 km || 
|-id=796 bgcolor=#E9E9E9
| 321796 ||  || — || February 14, 2004 || Palomar || NEAT || — || align=right | 3.4 km || 
|-id=797 bgcolor=#E9E9E9
| 321797 ||  || — || September 30, 2005 || Kitt Peak || Spacewatch || GEF || align=right | 1.1 km || 
|-id=798 bgcolor=#E9E9E9
| 321798 ||  || — || August 10, 2010 || Kitt Peak || Spacewatch || — || align=right | 1.7 km || 
|-id=799 bgcolor=#E9E9E9
| 321799 ||  || — || January 13, 1996 || Kitt Peak || Spacewatch || — || align=right data-sort-value="0.98" | 980 m || 
|-id=800 bgcolor=#fefefe
| 321800 ||  || — || August 10, 2010 || Kitt Peak || Spacewatch || — || align=right data-sort-value="0.87" | 870 m || 
|}

321801–321900 

|-bgcolor=#E9E9E9
| 321801 ||  || — || August 8, 2010 || WISE || WISE || — || align=right | 2.0 km || 
|-id=802 bgcolor=#d6d6d6
| 321802 Malaspina ||  ||  || September 15, 1977 || Palomar || E. Colombini || — || align=right | 5.2 km || 
|-id=803 bgcolor=#d6d6d6
| 321803 ||  || — || March 16, 2007 || Mount Lemmon || Mount Lemmon Survey || — || align=right | 3.4 km || 
|-id=804 bgcolor=#d6d6d6
| 321804 ||  || — || May 3, 2008 || Mount Lemmon || Mount Lemmon Survey || — || align=right | 4.7 km || 
|-id=805 bgcolor=#d6d6d6
| 321805 ||  || — || July 14, 2004 || Siding Spring || SSS || EUP || align=right | 4.8 km || 
|-id=806 bgcolor=#fefefe
| 321806 ||  || — || August 10, 2010 || Kitt Peak || Spacewatch || — || align=right data-sort-value="0.76" | 760 m || 
|-id=807 bgcolor=#fefefe
| 321807 ||  || — || August 13, 2010 || Kitt Peak || Spacewatch || FLO || align=right data-sort-value="0.80" | 800 m || 
|-id=808 bgcolor=#fefefe
| 321808 ||  || — || September 1, 2010 || Socorro || LINEAR || H || align=right data-sort-value="0.95" | 950 m || 
|-id=809 bgcolor=#fefefe
| 321809 ||  || — || November 17, 2000 || Kitt Peak || Spacewatch || — || align=right data-sort-value="0.69" | 690 m || 
|-id=810 bgcolor=#E9E9E9
| 321810 ||  || — || September 1, 2010 || ESA OGS || ESA OGS || MRX || align=right data-sort-value="0.93" | 930 m || 
|-id=811 bgcolor=#fefefe
| 321811 ||  || — || September 2, 2010 || Socorro || LINEAR || — || align=right | 1.2 km || 
|-id=812 bgcolor=#fefefe
| 321812 ||  || — || September 2, 2010 || Mount Lemmon || Mount Lemmon Survey || — || align=right data-sort-value="0.94" | 940 m || 
|-id=813 bgcolor=#fefefe
| 321813 ||  || — || September 1, 2010 || Socorro || LINEAR || NYS || align=right data-sort-value="0.95" | 950 m || 
|-id=814 bgcolor=#fefefe
| 321814 ||  || — || September 1, 2010 || Socorro || LINEAR || — || align=right data-sort-value="0.91" | 910 m || 
|-id=815 bgcolor=#E9E9E9
| 321815 ||  || — || March 31, 2003 || Anderson Mesa || LONEOS || GAL || align=right | 2.2 km || 
|-id=816 bgcolor=#d6d6d6
| 321816 ||  || — || September 1, 2010 || Socorro || LINEAR || — || align=right | 3.8 km || 
|-id=817 bgcolor=#fefefe
| 321817 ||  || — || September 2, 2010 || Mount Lemmon || Mount Lemmon Survey || — || align=right data-sort-value="0.89" | 890 m || 
|-id=818 bgcolor=#E9E9E9
| 321818 ||  || — || October 23, 2006 || Mount Lemmon || Mount Lemmon Survey || — || align=right | 1.6 km || 
|-id=819 bgcolor=#fefefe
| 321819 ||  || — || March 18, 2009 || Kitt Peak || Spacewatch || NYS || align=right data-sort-value="0.79" | 790 m || 
|-id=820 bgcolor=#E9E9E9
| 321820 ||  || — || August 20, 2001 || Cerro Tololo || M. W. Buie || HEN || align=right data-sort-value="0.84" | 840 m || 
|-id=821 bgcolor=#fefefe
| 321821 ||  || — || September 3, 2010 || Geisei || T. Seki || H || align=right data-sort-value="0.97" | 970 m || 
|-id=822 bgcolor=#E9E9E9
| 321822 ||  || — || October 31, 2006 || Mount Lemmon || Mount Lemmon Survey || — || align=right | 2.8 km || 
|-id=823 bgcolor=#E9E9E9
| 321823 ||  || — || October 8, 1996 || Kitt Peak || Spacewatch || AGN || align=right | 1.5 km || 
|-id=824 bgcolor=#E9E9E9
| 321824 ||  || — || October 4, 2006 || Mount Lemmon || Mount Lemmon Survey || — || align=right | 1.3 km || 
|-id=825 bgcolor=#fefefe
| 321825 ||  || — || September 16, 2003 || Kitt Peak || Spacewatch || — || align=right data-sort-value="0.87" | 870 m || 
|-id=826 bgcolor=#fefefe
| 321826 ||  || — || May 26, 2006 || Mount Lemmon || Mount Lemmon Survey || V || align=right data-sort-value="0.62" | 620 m || 
|-id=827 bgcolor=#E9E9E9
| 321827 ||  || — || October 27, 2006 || Catalina || CSS || RAF || align=right | 1.4 km || 
|-id=828 bgcolor=#fefefe
| 321828 ||  || — || September 4, 2010 || Kitt Peak || Spacewatch || — || align=right data-sort-value="0.88" | 880 m || 
|-id=829 bgcolor=#E9E9E9
| 321829 ||  || — || October 2, 2006 || Mount Lemmon || Mount Lemmon Survey || — || align=right | 1.4 km || 
|-id=830 bgcolor=#fefefe
| 321830 ||  || — || September 22, 2003 || Palomar || NEAT || V || align=right data-sort-value="0.71" | 710 m || 
|-id=831 bgcolor=#E9E9E9
| 321831 ||  || — || March 26, 2008 || Mount Lemmon || Mount Lemmon Survey || — || align=right | 1.9 km || 
|-id=832 bgcolor=#fefefe
| 321832 ||  || — || September 5, 2010 || Wildberg || R. Apitzsch || — || align=right data-sort-value="0.91" | 910 m || 
|-id=833 bgcolor=#E9E9E9
| 321833 ||  || — || November 17, 2006 || Catalina || CSS || — || align=right | 1.9 km || 
|-id=834 bgcolor=#fefefe
| 321834 ||  || — || January 19, 2004 || Kitt Peak || Spacewatch || MAS || align=right data-sort-value="0.94" | 940 m || 
|-id=835 bgcolor=#E9E9E9
| 321835 ||  || — || September 20, 2001 || Kitt Peak || Spacewatch || — || align=right | 2.0 km || 
|-id=836 bgcolor=#fefefe
| 321836 ||  || — || September 18, 2003 || Kitt Peak || Spacewatch || — || align=right | 1.2 km || 
|-id=837 bgcolor=#fefefe
| 321837 ||  || — || October 13, 1999 || Apache Point || SDSS || — || align=right data-sort-value="0.89" | 890 m || 
|-id=838 bgcolor=#fefefe
| 321838 ||  || — || March 11, 2005 || Mount Lemmon || Mount Lemmon Survey || — || align=right data-sort-value="0.91" | 910 m || 
|-id=839 bgcolor=#E9E9E9
| 321839 ||  || — || December 21, 2006 || Kitt Peak || Spacewatch || — || align=right | 2.1 km || 
|-id=840 bgcolor=#E9E9E9
| 321840 ||  || — || March 4, 2008 || Kitt Peak || Spacewatch || — || align=right | 2.2 km || 
|-id=841 bgcolor=#E9E9E9
| 321841 ||  || — || April 9, 2008 || Kitt Peak || Spacewatch || NEM || align=right | 2.2 km || 
|-id=842 bgcolor=#d6d6d6
| 321842 ||  || — || September 7, 1999 || Kitt Peak || Spacewatch || — || align=right | 2.6 km || 
|-id=843 bgcolor=#E9E9E9
| 321843 ||  || — || March 6, 2008 || Mount Lemmon || Mount Lemmon Survey || HNS || align=right | 1.1 km || 
|-id=844 bgcolor=#d6d6d6
| 321844 ||  || — || November 1, 2005 || Catalina || CSS || — || align=right | 3.0 km || 
|-id=845 bgcolor=#E9E9E9
| 321845 ||  || — || September 11, 2010 || Kitt Peak || Spacewatch || — || align=right data-sort-value="0.80" | 800 m || 
|-id=846 bgcolor=#E9E9E9
| 321846 ||  || — || September 11, 2010 || Kitt Peak || Spacewatch || WIT || align=right data-sort-value="0.99" | 990 m || 
|-id=847 bgcolor=#fefefe
| 321847 ||  || — || November 18, 2007 || Mount Lemmon || Mount Lemmon Survey || — || align=right data-sort-value="0.83" | 830 m || 
|-id=848 bgcolor=#fefefe
| 321848 ||  || — || February 11, 2004 || Kitt Peak || Spacewatch || — || align=right data-sort-value="0.95" | 950 m || 
|-id=849 bgcolor=#E9E9E9
| 321849 ||  || — || June 28, 2005 || Kitt Peak || Spacewatch || — || align=right | 1.8 km || 
|-id=850 bgcolor=#E9E9E9
| 321850 ||  || — || September 19, 2006 || Catalina || CSS || — || align=right | 2.0 km || 
|-id=851 bgcolor=#E9E9E9
| 321851 ||  || — || September 14, 1996 || Kitt Peak || Spacewatch || — || align=right | 2.5 km || 
|-id=852 bgcolor=#fefefe
| 321852 ||  || — || August 19, 2006 || Kitt Peak || Spacewatch || — || align=right data-sort-value="0.92" | 920 m || 
|-id=853 bgcolor=#fefefe
| 321853 ||  || — || April 5, 2002 || Palomar || NEAT || V || align=right data-sort-value="0.87" | 870 m || 
|-id=854 bgcolor=#E9E9E9
| 321854 ||  || — || September 15, 2010 || Kitt Peak || Spacewatch || — || align=right | 2.1 km || 
|-id=855 bgcolor=#fefefe
| 321855 ||  || — || September 13, 2010 || La Sagra || OAM Obs. || — || align=right | 1.4 km || 
|-id=856 bgcolor=#E9E9E9
| 321856 ||  || — || September 15, 2010 || Kitt Peak || Spacewatch || — || align=right data-sort-value="0.93" | 930 m || 
|-id=857 bgcolor=#E9E9E9
| 321857 ||  || — || March 21, 1999 || Apache Point || SDSS || — || align=right | 2.8 km || 
|-id=858 bgcolor=#fefefe
| 321858 ||  || — || September 15, 2006 || Kitt Peak || Spacewatch || — || align=right | 1.3 km || 
|-id=859 bgcolor=#d6d6d6
| 321859 ||  || — || September 7, 2004 || Kitt Peak || Spacewatch || HYG || align=right | 2.6 km || 
|-id=860 bgcolor=#E9E9E9
| 321860 ||  || — || March 15, 2004 || Kitt Peak || Spacewatch || — || align=right | 1.5 km || 
|-id=861 bgcolor=#E9E9E9
| 321861 ||  || — || December 22, 2003 || Kitt Peak || Spacewatch || — || align=right | 1.4 km || 
|-id=862 bgcolor=#E9E9E9
| 321862 ||  || — || December 9, 2006 || Kitt Peak || Spacewatch || AGN || align=right | 1.5 km || 
|-id=863 bgcolor=#E9E9E9
| 321863 ||  || — || October 22, 2006 || Catalina || CSS || — || align=right | 1.0 km || 
|-id=864 bgcolor=#fefefe
| 321864 ||  || — || May 23, 2006 || Mount Lemmon || Mount Lemmon Survey || NYS || align=right data-sort-value="0.83" | 830 m || 
|-id=865 bgcolor=#fefefe
| 321865 ||  || — || February 9, 2005 || Mount Lemmon || Mount Lemmon Survey || V || align=right data-sort-value="0.52" | 520 m || 
|-id=866 bgcolor=#fefefe
| 321866 ||  || — || November 4, 1999 || Socorro || LINEAR || NYS || align=right data-sort-value="0.74" | 740 m || 
|-id=867 bgcolor=#fefefe
| 321867 ||  || — || November 8, 2007 || Mount Lemmon || Mount Lemmon Survey || — || align=right | 1.0 km || 
|-id=868 bgcolor=#fefefe
| 321868 ||  || — || September 9, 2010 || Kitt Peak || Spacewatch || NYS || align=right data-sort-value="0.86" | 860 m || 
|-id=869 bgcolor=#E9E9E9
| 321869 ||  || — || March 29, 2008 || Mount Lemmon || Mount Lemmon Survey || — || align=right | 2.0 km || 
|-id=870 bgcolor=#E9E9E9
| 321870 ||  || — || September 10, 2010 || Mount Lemmon || Mount Lemmon Survey || — || align=right | 2.6 km || 
|-id=871 bgcolor=#d6d6d6
| 321871 ||  || — || November 10, 2005 || Catalina || CSS || — || align=right | 2.8 km || 
|-id=872 bgcolor=#E9E9E9
| 321872 ||  || — || October 15, 2001 || Apache Point || SDSS || — || align=right | 2.1 km || 
|-id=873 bgcolor=#fefefe
| 321873 ||  || — || March 16, 2009 || Kitt Peak || Spacewatch || — || align=right data-sort-value="0.87" | 870 m || 
|-id=874 bgcolor=#fefefe
| 321874 ||  || — || June 19, 2006 || Mount Lemmon || Mount Lemmon Survey || MAS || align=right data-sort-value="0.78" | 780 m || 
|-id=875 bgcolor=#fefefe
| 321875 ||  || — || August 4, 2003 || Kitt Peak || Spacewatch || — || align=right data-sort-value="0.80" | 800 m || 
|-id=876 bgcolor=#fefefe
| 321876 ||  || — || February 23, 2001 || Cerro Tololo || DLS || NYS || align=right data-sort-value="0.75" | 750 m || 
|-id=877 bgcolor=#E9E9E9
| 321877 ||  || — || July 21, 2001 || Haleakala || NEAT || — || align=right | 1.6 km || 
|-id=878 bgcolor=#E9E9E9
| 321878 ||  || — || October 28, 1997 || Kitt Peak || Spacewatch || MRX || align=right | 1.1 km || 
|-id=879 bgcolor=#fefefe
| 321879 ||  || — || November 6, 2007 || Kitt Peak || Spacewatch || — || align=right | 1.1 km || 
|-id=880 bgcolor=#E9E9E9
| 321880 ||  || — || October 2, 2006 || Mount Lemmon || Mount Lemmon Survey || — || align=right | 1.6 km || 
|-id=881 bgcolor=#E9E9E9
| 321881 ||  || — || May 28, 2009 || Mount Lemmon || Mount Lemmon Survey || AGN || align=right | 1.5 km || 
|-id=882 bgcolor=#fefefe
| 321882 ||  || — || September 8, 2010 || Kitt Peak || Spacewatch || — || align=right data-sort-value="0.93" | 930 m || 
|-id=883 bgcolor=#fefefe
| 321883 ||  || — || October 16, 1995 || Kitt Peak || Spacewatch || — || align=right data-sort-value="0.83" | 830 m || 
|-id=884 bgcolor=#d6d6d6
| 321884 ||  || — || October 18, 1995 || Kitt Peak || Spacewatch || — || align=right | 3.1 km || 
|-id=885 bgcolor=#fefefe
| 321885 ||  || — || March 18, 2001 || Socorro || LINEAR || V || align=right data-sort-value="0.74" | 740 m || 
|-id=886 bgcolor=#E9E9E9
| 321886 ||  || — || September 19, 2001 || Socorro || LINEAR || WIT || align=right data-sort-value="0.92" | 920 m || 
|-id=887 bgcolor=#fefefe
| 321887 ||  || — || February 27, 2009 || Mount Lemmon || Mount Lemmon Survey || — || align=right data-sort-value="0.90" | 900 m || 
|-id=888 bgcolor=#E9E9E9
| 321888 ||  || — || February 2, 2008 || Mount Lemmon || Mount Lemmon Survey || — || align=right data-sort-value="0.86" | 860 m || 
|-id=889 bgcolor=#d6d6d6
| 321889 ||  || — || April 12, 2002 || Socorro || LINEAR || — || align=right | 4.0 km || 
|-id=890 bgcolor=#E9E9E9
| 321890 ||  || — || December 13, 2006 || Catalina || CSS || — || align=right | 2.1 km || 
|-id=891 bgcolor=#E9E9E9
| 321891 ||  || — || February 9, 2008 || Mount Lemmon || Mount Lemmon Survey || — || align=right | 1.8 km || 
|-id=892 bgcolor=#d6d6d6
| 321892 ||  || — || September 9, 2004 || Kitt Peak || Spacewatch || HYG || align=right | 3.2 km || 
|-id=893 bgcolor=#E9E9E9
| 321893 ||  || — || October 23, 2006 || Catalina || CSS || — || align=right | 2.3 km || 
|-id=894 bgcolor=#E9E9E9
| 321894 ||  || — || March 11, 2008 || Kitt Peak || Spacewatch || — || align=right | 2.1 km || 
|-id=895 bgcolor=#d6d6d6
| 321895 ||  || — || March 10, 2007 || Mount Lemmon || Mount Lemmon Survey || — || align=right | 2.8 km || 
|-id=896 bgcolor=#fefefe
| 321896 ||  || — || August 31, 2003 || Kitt Peak || Spacewatch || FLO || align=right data-sort-value="0.64" | 640 m || 
|-id=897 bgcolor=#E9E9E9
| 321897 ||  || — || October 2, 2010 || Kitt Peak || Spacewatch || — || align=right | 1.8 km || 
|-id=898 bgcolor=#fefefe
| 321898 ||  || — || October 19, 2003 || Kitt Peak || Spacewatch || NYS || align=right data-sort-value="0.79" | 790 m || 
|-id=899 bgcolor=#d6d6d6
| 321899 ||  || — || August 20, 2004 || Catalina || CSS || — || align=right | 4.5 km || 
|-id=900 bgcolor=#fefefe
| 321900 ||  || — || August 27, 2006 || Kitt Peak || Spacewatch || NYS || align=right data-sort-value="0.59" | 590 m || 
|}

321901–322000 

|-bgcolor=#d6d6d6
| 321901 ||  || — || August 28, 2005 || Kitt Peak || Spacewatch || K-2 || align=right | 1.6 km || 
|-id=902 bgcolor=#fefefe
| 321902 ||  || — || May 27, 2009 || Mount Lemmon || Mount Lemmon Survey || V || align=right data-sort-value="0.77" | 770 m || 
|-id=903 bgcolor=#d6d6d6
| 321903 ||  || — || August 31, 2005 || Kitt Peak || Spacewatch || 615 || align=right | 1.3 km || 
|-id=904 bgcolor=#fefefe
| 321904 ||  || — || June 18, 2006 || Kitt Peak || Spacewatch || FLO || align=right data-sort-value="0.64" | 640 m || 
|-id=905 bgcolor=#fefefe
| 321905 ||  || — || December 19, 2007 || Mount Lemmon || Mount Lemmon Survey || — || align=right data-sort-value="0.90" | 900 m || 
|-id=906 bgcolor=#fefefe
| 321906 ||  || — || January 13, 2002 || Kitt Peak || Spacewatch || — || align=right data-sort-value="0.75" | 750 m || 
|-id=907 bgcolor=#fefefe
| 321907 ||  || — || October 1, 2003 || Kitt Peak || Spacewatch || FLO || align=right data-sort-value="0.76" | 760 m || 
|-id=908 bgcolor=#d6d6d6
| 321908 ||  || — || October 1, 2010 || Catalina || CSS || — || align=right | 3.5 km || 
|-id=909 bgcolor=#fefefe
| 321909 ||  || — || October 1, 2010 || Catalina || CSS || — || align=right | 1.1 km || 
|-id=910 bgcolor=#E9E9E9
| 321910 ||  || — || October 13, 2006 || Kitt Peak || Spacewatch || — || align=right data-sort-value="0.96" | 960 m || 
|-id=911 bgcolor=#E9E9E9
| 321911 ||  || — || August 27, 2005 || Kitt Peak || Spacewatch || AGN || align=right | 1.2 km || 
|-id=912 bgcolor=#d6d6d6
| 321912 ||  || — || March 20, 2007 || Anderson Mesa || LONEOS || EUP || align=right | 3.3 km || 
|-id=913 bgcolor=#d6d6d6
| 321913 ||  || — || October 6, 1994 || Kitt Peak || Spacewatch || EOS || align=right | 2.3 km || 
|-id=914 bgcolor=#d6d6d6
| 321914 ||  || — || December 26, 2005 || Kitt Peak || Spacewatch || — || align=right | 3.1 km || 
|-id=915 bgcolor=#E9E9E9
| 321915 ||  || — || March 5, 2008 || Kitt Peak || Spacewatch || ADE || align=right | 1.8 km || 
|-id=916 bgcolor=#fefefe
| 321916 ||  || — || April 4, 2005 || Kitt Peak || Spacewatch || NYS || align=right data-sort-value="0.74" | 740 m || 
|-id=917 bgcolor=#fefefe
| 321917 ||  || — || March 8, 2005 || Kitt Peak || Spacewatch || V || align=right data-sort-value="0.61" | 610 m || 
|-id=918 bgcolor=#fefefe
| 321918 ||  || — || April 3, 2005 || Palomar || NEAT || V || align=right | 1.1 km || 
|-id=919 bgcolor=#E9E9E9
| 321919 ||  || — || February 26, 2008 || Kitt Peak || Spacewatch || WIT || align=right | 1.1 km || 
|-id=920 bgcolor=#fefefe
| 321920 ||  || — || April 12, 2002 || Kitt Peak || Spacewatch || NYS || align=right data-sort-value="0.82" | 820 m || 
|-id=921 bgcolor=#E9E9E9
| 321921 ||  || — || February 2, 1998 || Kitt Peak || Spacewatch || INO || align=right | 1.2 km || 
|-id=922 bgcolor=#fefefe
| 321922 ||  || — || October 5, 2000 || Kitt Peak || Spacewatch || — || align=right | 1.1 km || 
|-id=923 bgcolor=#fefefe
| 321923 ||  || — || March 3, 2005 || Kitt Peak || Spacewatch || — || align=right data-sort-value="0.75" | 750 m || 
|-id=924 bgcolor=#E9E9E9
| 321924 ||  || — || January 5, 2003 || Socorro || LINEAR || — || align=right | 1.9 km || 
|-id=925 bgcolor=#fefefe
| 321925 ||  || — || April 20, 2009 || Mount Lemmon || Mount Lemmon Survey || — || align=right data-sort-value="0.94" | 940 m || 
|-id=926 bgcolor=#d6d6d6
| 321926 ||  || — || November 9, 1999 || Socorro || LINEAR || — || align=right | 3.4 km || 
|-id=927 bgcolor=#d6d6d6
| 321927 ||  || — || April 5, 2008 || Kitt Peak || Spacewatch || BRA || align=right | 1.8 km || 
|-id=928 bgcolor=#fefefe
| 321928 ||  || — || March 16, 2009 || Kitt Peak || Spacewatch || — || align=right data-sort-value="0.75" | 750 m || 
|-id=929 bgcolor=#E9E9E9
| 321929 ||  || — || September 21, 2001 || Socorro || LINEAR || WIT || align=right | 1.0 km || 
|-id=930 bgcolor=#d6d6d6
| 321930 ||  || — || October 30, 2005 || Kitt Peak || Spacewatch || — || align=right | 3.4 km || 
|-id=931 bgcolor=#E9E9E9
| 321931 ||  || — || February 13, 2008 || Mount Lemmon || Mount Lemmon Survey || — || align=right | 2.3 km || 
|-id=932 bgcolor=#fefefe
| 321932 ||  || — || January 17, 2004 || Palomar || NEAT || — || align=right data-sort-value="0.94" | 940 m || 
|-id=933 bgcolor=#E9E9E9
| 321933 ||  || — || September 30, 2006 || Mount Lemmon || Mount Lemmon Survey || — || align=right | 1.5 km || 
|-id=934 bgcolor=#fefefe
| 321934 ||  || — || October 19, 2003 || Apache Point || SDSS || — || align=right data-sort-value="0.75" | 750 m || 
|-id=935 bgcolor=#d6d6d6
| 321935 ||  || — || September 6, 2010 || Kitt Peak || Spacewatch || KOR || align=right | 1.5 km || 
|-id=936 bgcolor=#E9E9E9
| 321936 ||  || — || October 18, 2006 || Kitt Peak || Spacewatch || — || align=right | 1.4 km || 
|-id=937 bgcolor=#E9E9E9
| 321937 ||  || — || April 1, 2008 || Kitt Peak || Spacewatch || GEF || align=right | 1.2 km || 
|-id=938 bgcolor=#fefefe
| 321938 ||  || — || September 19, 2003 || Palomar || NEAT || — || align=right data-sort-value="0.91" | 910 m || 
|-id=939 bgcolor=#fefefe
| 321939 ||  || — || November 26, 2003 || Kitt Peak || Spacewatch || V || align=right data-sort-value="0.72" | 720 m || 
|-id=940 bgcolor=#E9E9E9
| 321940 ||  || — || November 25, 2006 || Mount Lemmon || Mount Lemmon Survey || — || align=right | 1.7 km || 
|-id=941 bgcolor=#E9E9E9
| 321941 ||  || — || November 24, 2006 || Kitt Peak || Spacewatch || — || align=right | 1.7 km || 
|-id=942 bgcolor=#E9E9E9
| 321942 ||  || — || December 12, 2006 || Mount Lemmon || Mount Lemmon Survey || HOF || align=right | 2.6 km || 
|-id=943 bgcolor=#d6d6d6
| 321943 ||  || — || November 16, 2006 || Mount Lemmon || Mount Lemmon Survey || YAK || align=right | 3.2 km || 
|-id=944 bgcolor=#d6d6d6
| 321944 ||  || — || January 28, 2007 || Mount Lemmon || Mount Lemmon Survey || — || align=right | 2.3 km || 
|-id=945 bgcolor=#d6d6d6
| 321945 ||  || — || March 11, 2007 || Mount Lemmon || Mount Lemmon Survey || EUP || align=right | 5.0 km || 
|-id=946 bgcolor=#d6d6d6
| 321946 ||  || — || December 4, 2005 || Kitt Peak || Spacewatch || HYG || align=right | 3.4 km || 
|-id=947 bgcolor=#E9E9E9
| 321947 ||  || — || February 28, 2008 || Catalina || CSS || — || align=right | 1.6 km || 
|-id=948 bgcolor=#fefefe
| 321948 ||  || — || August 1, 2000 || Socorro || LINEAR || — || align=right data-sort-value="0.75" | 750 m || 
|-id=949 bgcolor=#fefefe
| 321949 ||  || — || December 19, 2007 || Mount Lemmon || Mount Lemmon Survey || V || align=right data-sort-value="0.73" | 730 m || 
|-id=950 bgcolor=#FA8072
| 321950 ||  || — || November 17, 2007 || Kitt Peak || Spacewatch || — || align=right data-sort-value="0.94" | 940 m || 
|-id=951 bgcolor=#fefefe
| 321951 ||  || — || October 19, 2003 || Palomar || NEAT || — || align=right data-sort-value="0.98" | 980 m || 
|-id=952 bgcolor=#fefefe
| 321952 ||  || — || April 1, 2009 || Mount Lemmon || Mount Lemmon Survey || FLO || align=right data-sort-value="0.68" | 680 m || 
|-id=953 bgcolor=#fefefe
| 321953 ||  || — || October 23, 2003 || Kitt Peak || Spacewatch || V || align=right data-sort-value="0.83" | 830 m || 
|-id=954 bgcolor=#E9E9E9
| 321954 ||  || — || February 1, 2008 || Kitt Peak || Spacewatch || — || align=right | 2.0 km || 
|-id=955 bgcolor=#d6d6d6
| 321955 ||  || — || March 13, 2002 || Socorro || LINEAR || EOS || align=right | 2.2 km || 
|-id=956 bgcolor=#E9E9E9
| 321956 ||  || — || November 13, 2006 || Kitt Peak || Spacewatch || — || align=right | 1.6 km || 
|-id=957 bgcolor=#E9E9E9
| 321957 ||  || — || October 2, 1997 || Caussols || ODAS || — || align=right | 1.8 km || 
|-id=958 bgcolor=#E9E9E9
| 321958 ||  || — || March 9, 2003 || Kitt Peak || Spacewatch || HOF || align=right | 3.1 km || 
|-id=959 bgcolor=#E9E9E9
| 321959 ||  || — || November 17, 2006 || Kitt Peak || Spacewatch || — || align=right | 1.8 km || 
|-id=960 bgcolor=#fefefe
| 321960 ||  || — || February 20, 2002 || Kitt Peak || Spacewatch || — || align=right data-sort-value="0.90" | 900 m || 
|-id=961 bgcolor=#fefefe
| 321961 ||  || — || February 26, 2009 || Mount Lemmon || Mount Lemmon Survey || ERI || align=right | 1.9 km || 
|-id=962 bgcolor=#E9E9E9
| 321962 ||  || — || July 6, 1997 || Caussols || ODAS || — || align=right | 1.1 km || 
|-id=963 bgcolor=#d6d6d6
| 321963 ||  || — || May 8, 2008 || Mount Lemmon || Mount Lemmon Survey || VER || align=right | 3.6 km || 
|-id=964 bgcolor=#d6d6d6
| 321964 ||  || — || February 18, 2001 || Haleakala || NEAT || — || align=right | 3.9 km || 
|-id=965 bgcolor=#fefefe
| 321965 ||  || — || September 18, 1995 || Kitt Peak || Spacewatch || MAS || align=right data-sort-value="0.95" | 950 m || 
|-id=966 bgcolor=#E9E9E9
| 321966 ||  || — || October 17, 2001 || Kitt Peak || Spacewatch || PAD || align=right | 1.6 km || 
|-id=967 bgcolor=#d6d6d6
| 321967 ||  || — || October 25, 2005 || Mount Lemmon || Mount Lemmon Survey || — || align=right | 2.8 km || 
|-id=968 bgcolor=#d6d6d6
| 321968 ||  || — || March 19, 1996 || Kitt Peak || Spacewatch || — || align=right | 2.7 km || 
|-id=969 bgcolor=#d6d6d6
| 321969 ||  || — || December 12, 2001 || La Palma || T. Grav, M. W. Hansen || KOR || align=right | 1.6 km || 
|-id=970 bgcolor=#E9E9E9
| 321970 ||  || — || January 5, 2003 || Socorro || LINEAR || — || align=right | 1.4 km || 
|-id=971 bgcolor=#fefefe
| 321971 ||  || — || July 21, 2006 || Mount Lemmon || Mount Lemmon Survey || MAS || align=right data-sort-value="0.72" | 720 m || 
|-id=972 bgcolor=#E9E9E9
| 321972 ||  || — || May 8, 2005 || Kitt Peak || Spacewatch || — || align=right | 1.1 km || 
|-id=973 bgcolor=#E9E9E9
| 321973 ||  || — || August 29, 2005 || Kitt Peak || Spacewatch || — || align=right | 2.6 km || 
|-id=974 bgcolor=#E9E9E9
| 321974 ||  || — || January 26, 2003 || Haleakala || NEAT || GEF || align=right | 1.8 km || 
|-id=975 bgcolor=#d6d6d6
| 321975 ||  || — || January 9, 2007 || Mount Lemmon || Mount Lemmon Survey || CHA || align=right | 2.1 km || 
|-id=976 bgcolor=#fefefe
| 321976 ||  || — || December 14, 2004 || Kitt Peak || Spacewatch || — || align=right data-sort-value="0.81" | 810 m || 
|-id=977 bgcolor=#E9E9E9
| 321977 ||  || — || April 22, 2004 || Kitt Peak || Spacewatch || HNS || align=right | 1.6 km || 
|-id=978 bgcolor=#E9E9E9
| 321978 ||  || — || August 26, 2005 || Palomar || NEAT || — || align=right | 1.9 km || 
|-id=979 bgcolor=#E9E9E9
| 321979 ||  || — || December 9, 2006 || Kitt Peak || Spacewatch || — || align=right | 2.0 km || 
|-id=980 bgcolor=#E9E9E9
| 321980 ||  || — || September 25, 2005 || Kitt Peak || Spacewatch || — || align=right | 1.6 km || 
|-id=981 bgcolor=#d6d6d6
| 321981 ||  || — || November 3, 2005 || Kitt Peak || Spacewatch || — || align=right | 2.9 km || 
|-id=982 bgcolor=#E9E9E9
| 321982 ||  || — || December 21, 2006 || Kitt Peak || Spacewatch || — || align=right | 1.8 km || 
|-id=983 bgcolor=#d6d6d6
| 321983 ||  || — || December 5, 2005 || Socorro || LINEAR || — || align=right | 3.9 km || 
|-id=984 bgcolor=#d6d6d6
| 321984 ||  || — || July 22, 2003 || Haleakala || NEAT || 7:4 || align=right | 3.9 km || 
|-id=985 bgcolor=#fefefe
| 321985 ||  || — || August 28, 1995 || Kitt Peak || Spacewatch || — || align=right data-sort-value="0.98" | 980 m || 
|-id=986 bgcolor=#C2FFFF
| 321986 ||  || — || August 28, 1995 || Kitt Peak || Spacewatch || L4 || align=right | 8.7 km || 
|-id=987 bgcolor=#C2FFFF
| 321987 ||  || — || September 4, 2010 || Kitt Peak || Spacewatch || L4 || align=right | 11 km || 
|-id=988 bgcolor=#E9E9E9
| 321988 ||  || — || July 12, 2005 || Mount Lemmon || Mount Lemmon Survey || — || align=right | 1.1 km || 
|-id=989 bgcolor=#d6d6d6
| 321989 ||  || — || March 15, 2007 || Kitt Peak || Spacewatch || HYG || align=right | 4.4 km || 
|-id=990 bgcolor=#d6d6d6
| 321990 ||  || — || September 11, 2004 || Socorro || LINEAR || — || align=right | 4.1 km || 
|-id=991 bgcolor=#d6d6d6
| 321991 ||  || — || October 7, 2004 || Kitt Peak || Spacewatch || — || align=right | 2.9 km || 
|-id=992 bgcolor=#fefefe
| 321992 ||  || — || March 31, 2009 || Mount Lemmon || Mount Lemmon Survey || — || align=right data-sort-value="0.81" | 810 m || 
|-id=993 bgcolor=#E9E9E9
| 321993 ||  || — || October 15, 2001 || Palomar || NEAT || — || align=right | 2.4 km || 
|-id=994 bgcolor=#E9E9E9
| 321994 ||  || — || December 13, 2006 || Catalina || CSS || RAF || align=right | 1.5 km || 
|-id=995 bgcolor=#fefefe
| 321995 ||  || — || February 2, 2008 || Mount Lemmon || Mount Lemmon Survey || V || align=right data-sort-value="0.76" | 760 m || 
|-id=996 bgcolor=#E9E9E9
| 321996 ||  || — || October 30, 2010 || Mount Lemmon || Mount Lemmon Survey || AER || align=right | 1.8 km || 
|-id=997 bgcolor=#FA8072
| 321997 ||  || — || April 29, 2003 || Kitt Peak || Spacewatch || — || align=right data-sort-value="0.92" | 920 m || 
|-id=998 bgcolor=#E9E9E9
| 321998 ||  || — || September 6, 1997 || Caussols || ODAS || — || align=right | 1.1 km || 
|-id=999 bgcolor=#d6d6d6
| 321999 ||  || — || August 25, 2004 || Kitt Peak || Spacewatch || — || align=right | 4.4 km || 
|-id=000 bgcolor=#E9E9E9
| 322000 ||  || — || February 13, 2008 || Mount Lemmon || Mount Lemmon Survey || — || align=right | 1.7 km || 
|}

References

External links 
 Discovery Circumstances: Numbered Minor Planets (320001)–(325000) (IAU Minor Planet Center)

0321